= Flykälen =

Village in Jämtland County, Sweden

Coordinates: 63.8578°N 15.0145°E

Flykälen is a village of Krokom Municipality, Jämtland County in northern Sweden. The population is about 23. Every summer there is a tractor pulling event with old tractors and each Easter an ice fishing competition. The school in Flykälen was built 1891–1893. A new school was inaugurated 1947, but today the children of Flykälen have to travel to Laxsjö.

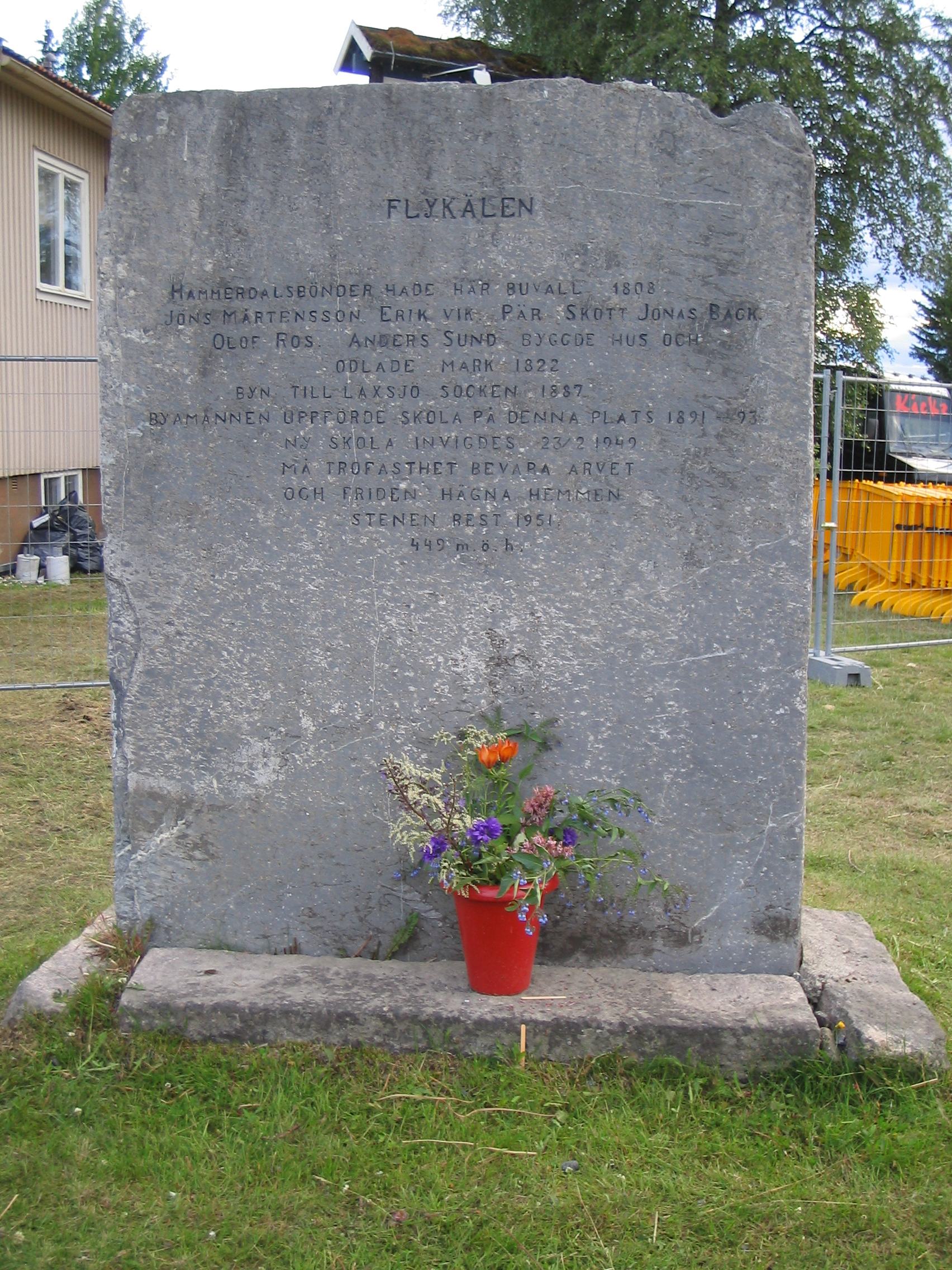
The monumental monolith with information about Flykälen. The stone is located in the centre of the village. May faithfulness protect the inheritance and peace enclose the homes is written on it.

== See also ==
- Krokom
- Föllinge
- Yxskaftkälen
