= Aspas =

Aspas may refer to:

== People ==
- Iago Aspas (born 1987), Spanish footballer
- Jonathan Aspas (born 1982), Spanish footballer

== Places ==
- Aspås, a locality in Krokom Municipality, Jämtland County, Sweden
- Aspas, Fars, a village in Fars Province, Iran
  - Aspas Rural District
- Espas, Zanjan, a village in Zanjan Province, Iran

== See also ==
- Espas, Gers, a village in Gers, France
- Isbaz, Dänew, a village in Lebap Province, Turkmenistan
- Ispas, Ukraine, a village in Chernivtsi Oblast, Ukraine
