= Svenskådalen Nature Reserve =

Nature reserve in Sweden

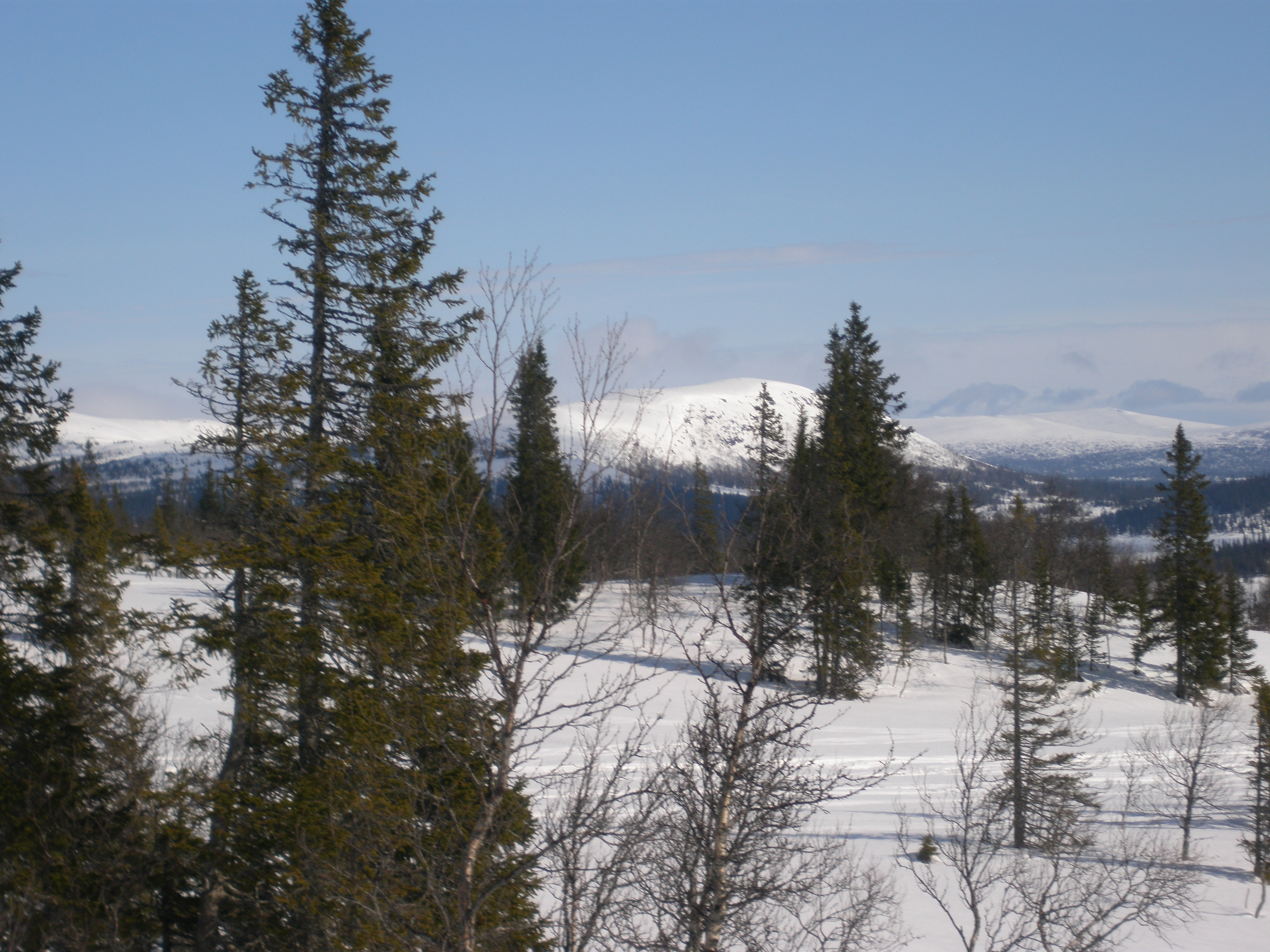

- Location within Jämtland Location within Sweden
- Location: Sweden
- Nearest city: Östersund
- Coordinates: 64°01′48″N 13°04′48″E
- Area: 250 km^{2} (62,000 acres)
- Established: 1990

Svenskådalen Nature Reserve (Swedish: Svenskådalens naturreservat) is a nature reserve in Jämtland County in Sweden.

Svenskådalen Nature Reserve comprises an area of forested mountains and two valleys rich in wetlands. One of these also contains areas of old-growth forest. The area as a whole is characterised by untouched wilderness. To the west, the nature reserve touches on the border of Skäckerfjällen Nature Reserve. Together, these two nature reserves have a circa 60 km (37 miles) long common border with Norway. The nature reserve is part of the EU-wide Natura 2000-wide network.

== Climate ==
Climate data for Korsvattnet A 1991-2020 normals (717m)
Month	Jan	Feb	Mar	Apr	May	Jun	Jul	Aug	Sep	Oct	Nov	Dec	Year
Mean daily maximum °C (°F)	−4.0 (24.8)	−4.6 (23.7)	−2.6 (27.3)	1.7 (35.1)	7.0 (44.6)	13.0 (55.4)	16.6 (61.9)	14.9 (58.8)	9.7 (49.5)	3.3 (37.9)	−1.2 (29.8)	−3.1 (26.4)	4.2 (39.6)
Daily mean °C (°F)	−7.0 (19.4)	−7.7 (18.1)	−5.7 (21.7)	−1.7 (28.9)	3.2 (37.8)	8.3 (46.9)	11.8 (53.2)	10.5 (50.9)	6.2 (43.2)	0.7 (33.3)	−3.6 (25.5)	−5.9 (21.4)	0.8 (33.4)
Mean daily minimum °C (°F)	−10.6 (12.9)	−11.3 (11.7)	−9.6 (14.7)	−5.2 (22.6)	−0.4 (31.3)	4.3 (39.7)	7.7 (45.9)	7.0 (44.6)	3.4 (38.1)	−1.4 (29.5)	−6.3 (20.7)	−9.3 (15.3)	−2.6 (27.3)
Average precipitation mm (inches)	88.5 (3.48)	70.3 (2.77)	74.0 (2.91)	52.8 (2.08)	55.3 (2.18)	77.3 (3.04)	90.2 (3.55)	88.7 (3.49)	98.7 (3.89)	89.4 (3.52)	85.5 (3.37)	86.5 (3.41)	957.2 (37.69)
Source: NOAA
