= Erika Kinsey =

Swedish high jumper

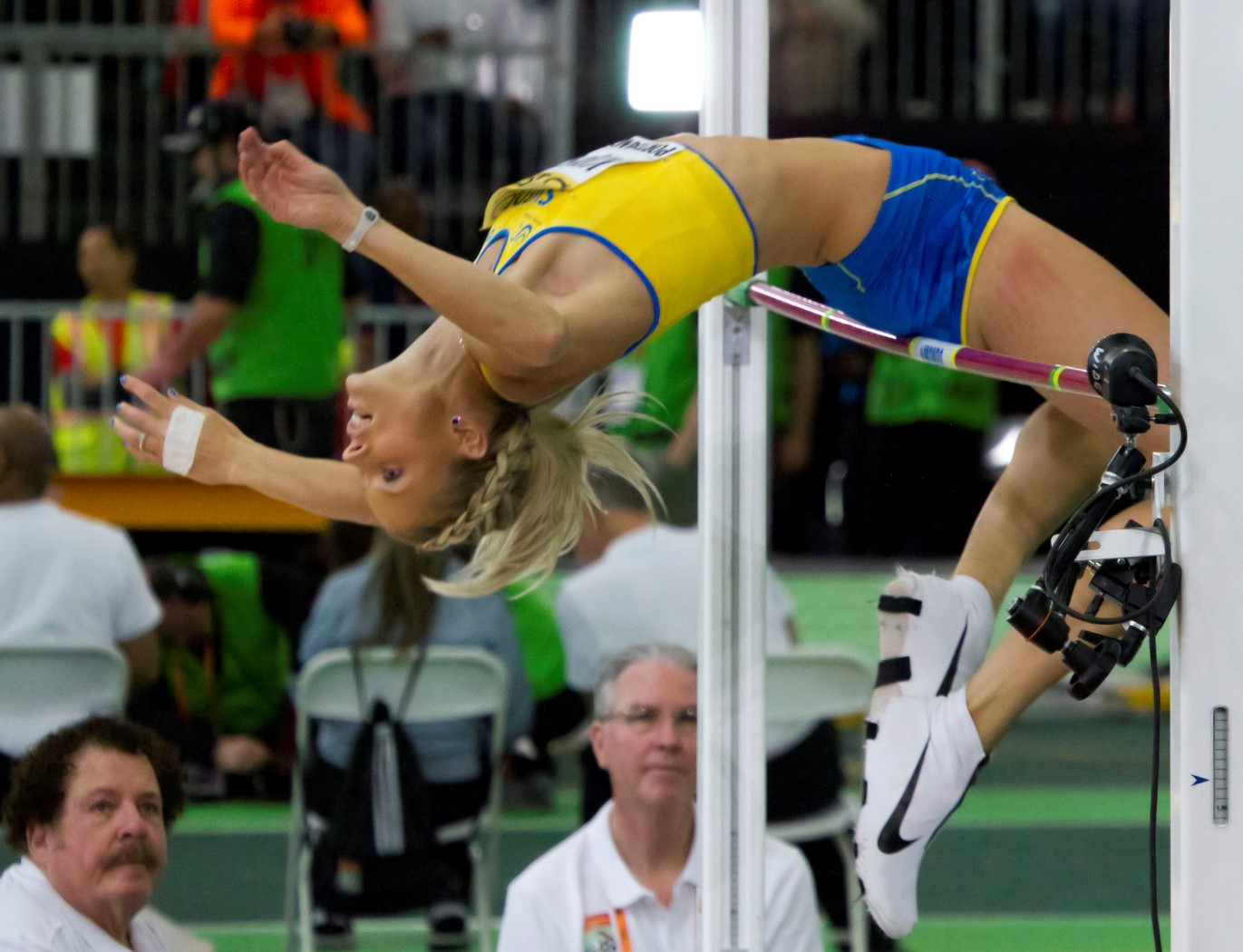

Personal information
- Born: Erika Anna Kristina Wiklund; 10 March 1988 (age 38) Nälden, Sweden
- Height: 186 cm (6 ft 1 in)
- Weight: 73 kg (161 lb)

Sport
- Country: Sweden
- Event(s): High jump Long jump Triple jump
- College team: Central Missouri Jennies
- Club: Trångsvikens IF

Achievements and titles
- Personal best: High jump: 1.97 m (2015)
Medal record
European Junior Championships
Gold medal – first place	2007 Hengelo	High jump
- Updated on 14 August 2015

Erika Anna Kristina Kinsey (née Wiklund; born 10 March 1988) is a Swedish high jumper. She was European Junior Champion in 2007.

== Biography ==
Wiklund was born in Nälden on 10 March 1988. She took up sports as a child, playing ice hockey and association football in addition to competing in athletics; she did not start concentrating on the high jump until she was 14. She was a leading age group jumper, clearing 1.86 m in 2004; the jump ranked her fourth on the world youth list that year, and second among athletes born in 1988 or later. In the following years her development stagnated, and she did not improve her personal best again until the 2007 indoor season; she placed fifth at the 2005 World Youth Championships and eighth at the 2006 World Junior Championships. In addition to the high jump, she occasionally competed in the long jump; she won both events at the 2005 Finland-Sweden youth international.

Wiklund won gold in the high jump at the 2007 European Junior Championships in Hengelo. In a very close competition, the top four all cleared 1.82 m; Wiklund later said she did not realize she had won on countback until a photographer told her. Wiklund improved her personal best to 1.91 m in 2008, but concentrating on athletics exhausted her mentally; she dropped the sport in 2009 and moved to Norway, where her brother lived, taking up ice hockey again. She had a brief comeback in 2011, winning bronze with a jump of 1.82 m at the Swedish championships.

In 2013 Wiklund decided to make a second, more serious comeback; she resumed high jumping in 2014, now as a student at the University of Central Missouri. In the summer of 2014 she married Daniel Kinsey, an American, and changed her name to Erika Kinsey. She attempted to qualify for the 2014 European Championships in Zürich, but failed to reach the qualifying standard of 1.90 m; she had a season best of 1.88 m both indoors and outdoors.

Kinsey's results improved in 2015; she was NCAA Division II champion in the high jump both indoors and outdoors, and in the triple jump indoors, helping the Central Missouri Jennies win their first team titles. She unexpectedly cleared 1.97 m at the European Team Championships in Cheboksary, improving her personal best from the MIAA outdoor championships by five centimetres; the jump moved her to third on the Swedish all-time list (behind Kajsa Bergqvist and Emma Green), and exceeded the qualifying standard for the 2015 World Championships in Beijing. She debuted in the IAAF Diamond League in July 2015 in Lausanne, jumping 1.94 m and placing third.
