= Trångsviken =

- Locality
- Location within Jämtland Location within Sweden
- Coordinates: 63°20′N 14°01′E
- Country: Sweden
- Province: Jämtland
- County: Jämtland County
- Municipality: Krokom Municipality

Area
  - Total: 0.64 km^{2} (0.25 sq mi)

Population (31 December 2010)
  - Total: 288
  - Density: 448/km^{2} (1,160/sq mi)
- Time zone: UTC+1 (CET)
  - Summer (DST): UTC+2 (CEST)

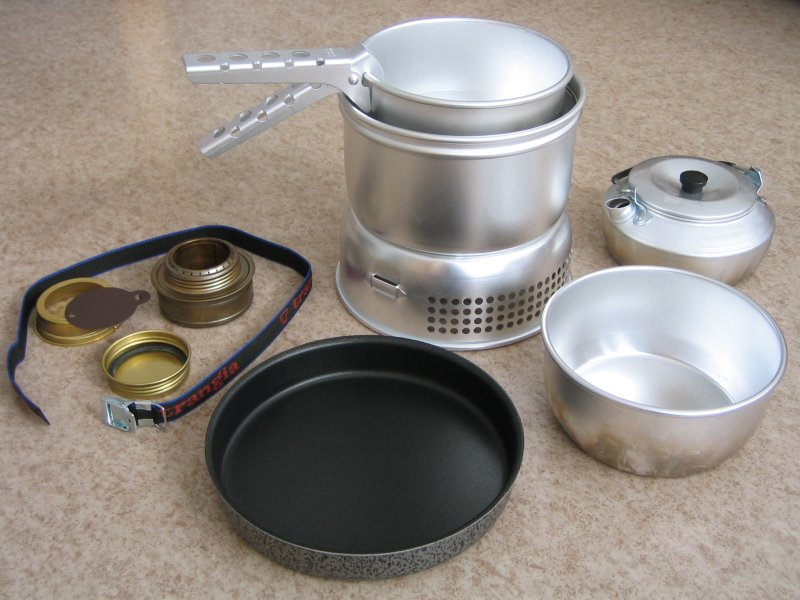
Trangia 27-4 series outdoor stove

Trångsviken is a locality situated in Alsen, Krokom Municipality, Jämtland County, Sweden with 288 inhabitants in 2010.
