= Vaplan =

- Locality
- Location within Jämtland Location within Sweden
- Coordinates: 63°20′N 14°13′E
- Country: Sweden
- Province: Jämtland
- County: Jämtland County
- Municipality: Krokom Municipality

Area
  - Total: 0.56 km^{2} (0.22 sq mi)

Population (31 December 2010)
  - Total: 263
  - Density: 469/km^{2} (1,210/sq mi)
- Time zone: UTC+1 (CET)
  - Summer (DST): UTC+2 (CEST)

Vaplan (Swedish pronunciation: [ˈvɑ̂ːplan]) is a locality situated in Krokom Municipality, Jämtland County, Sweden with 263 inhabitants in 2010.
