= Yxskaftkälen =

Coordinates: 63°47′N 15°13′E

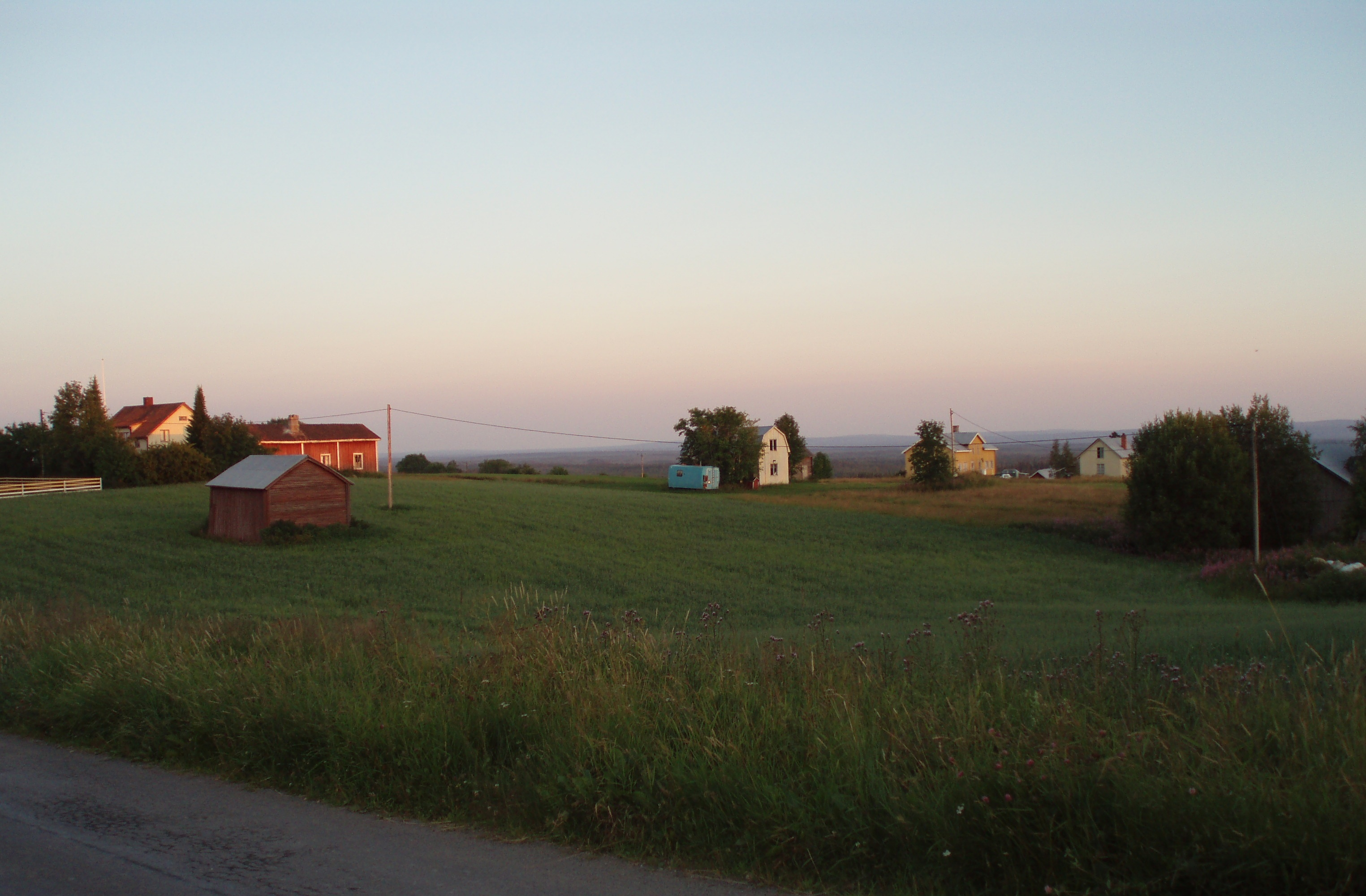
Farm steads in Yxskaftkälen

Yxskaftkälen is a village of Strömsund Municipality, Jämtland County in northern Sweden. The name origins from the wood which was suitable for making handles to an axe. The village was founded in 1758. The population is 77 (2023).

== See also ==
- Flykälen
