= Ytterån =

- Locality
- Location within Jämtland Location within Sweden
- Coordinates: 63°19′N 14°10′E
- Country: Sweden
- Province: Jämtland
- County: Jämtland County
- Municipality: Krokom Municipality

Area
  - Total: 1.03 km^{2} (0.40 sq mi)

Population (31 December 2010)
  - Total: 204
  - Density: 199/km^{2} (520/sq mi)
- Time zone: UTC+1 (CET)
  - Summer (DST): UTC+2 (CEST)

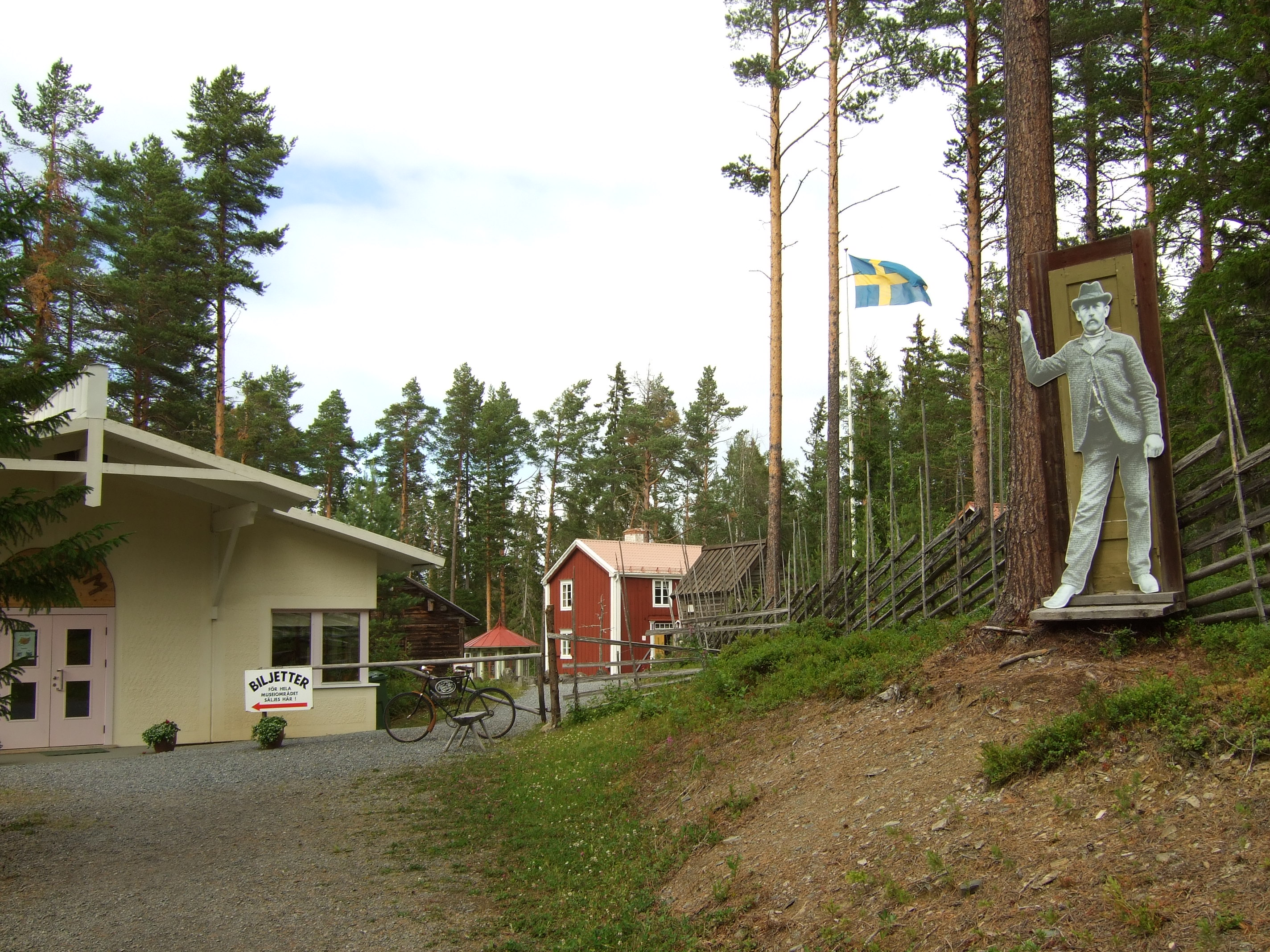

Ytterån (from Old Norse Ýtriá 'outer river') is a locality situated in Krokom Municipality, Jämtland County, Sweden with 204 inhabitants in 2010.
