= Dvärsätt =

- Locality
- Location within Jämtland Location within Sweden
- Coordinates: 63°19′N 14°28′E
- Country: Sweden
- Province: Jämtland
- County: Jämtland County
- Municipality: Krokom Municipality

Area
  - Total: 0.41 km^{2} (0.16 sq mi)

Population (31 December 2010)
  - Total: 461
  - Density: 1,116/km^{2} (2,890/sq mi)
- Time zone: UTC+1 (CET)
  - Summer (DST): UTC+2 (CEST)

Dvärsätt (from Old Norse Dvergsetr 'dwarf dairy land') is a locality situated in Krokom Municipality, Jämtland County, Sweden with 461 inhabitants in 2010.
