= Ås, Krokom Municipality =

Ås
- Locality
- Location within Jämtland Location within Sweden
- Coordinates: 63°15′N 14°34′E
- Country: Sweden
- Province: Jämtland
- County: Jämtland County
- Municipality: Krokom Municipality

Area
  - Total: 1.20 km^{2} (0.46 sq mi)

Population (31 December 2010)
  - Total: 1,218
  - Density: 1,014/km^{2} (2,630/sq mi)
- Time zone: UTC+1 (CET)
  - Summer (DST): UTC+2 (CEST)

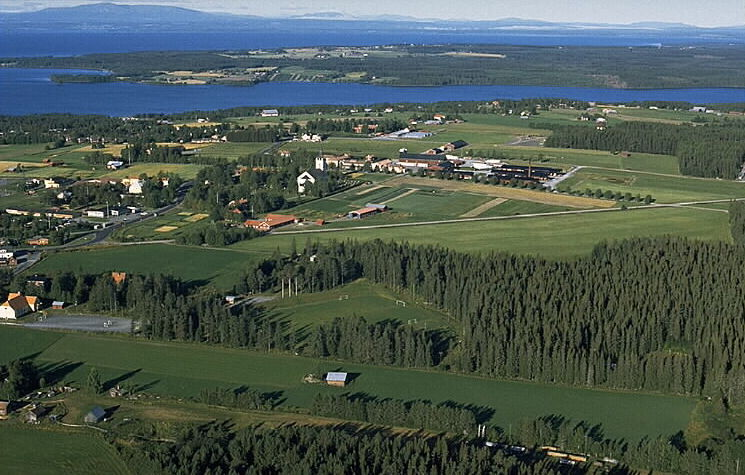
Aerial view of Ås

Ås (from Old Norse áss 'ridge') is a locality situated in Krokom Municipality, Jämtland County, Sweden with 1,218 inhabitants in 2010.

Nearby villages include Sem, Sörbyn, Hållsta, Täng, Tängtorpet, Dille, Backen, Trättgärde, Kännåsen, Lien, Torsta, Hov, Ösa, Birka.
