= List of governors of Jämtland County =

Governor of Jämtland County
- Landshövding i Jämtlands län
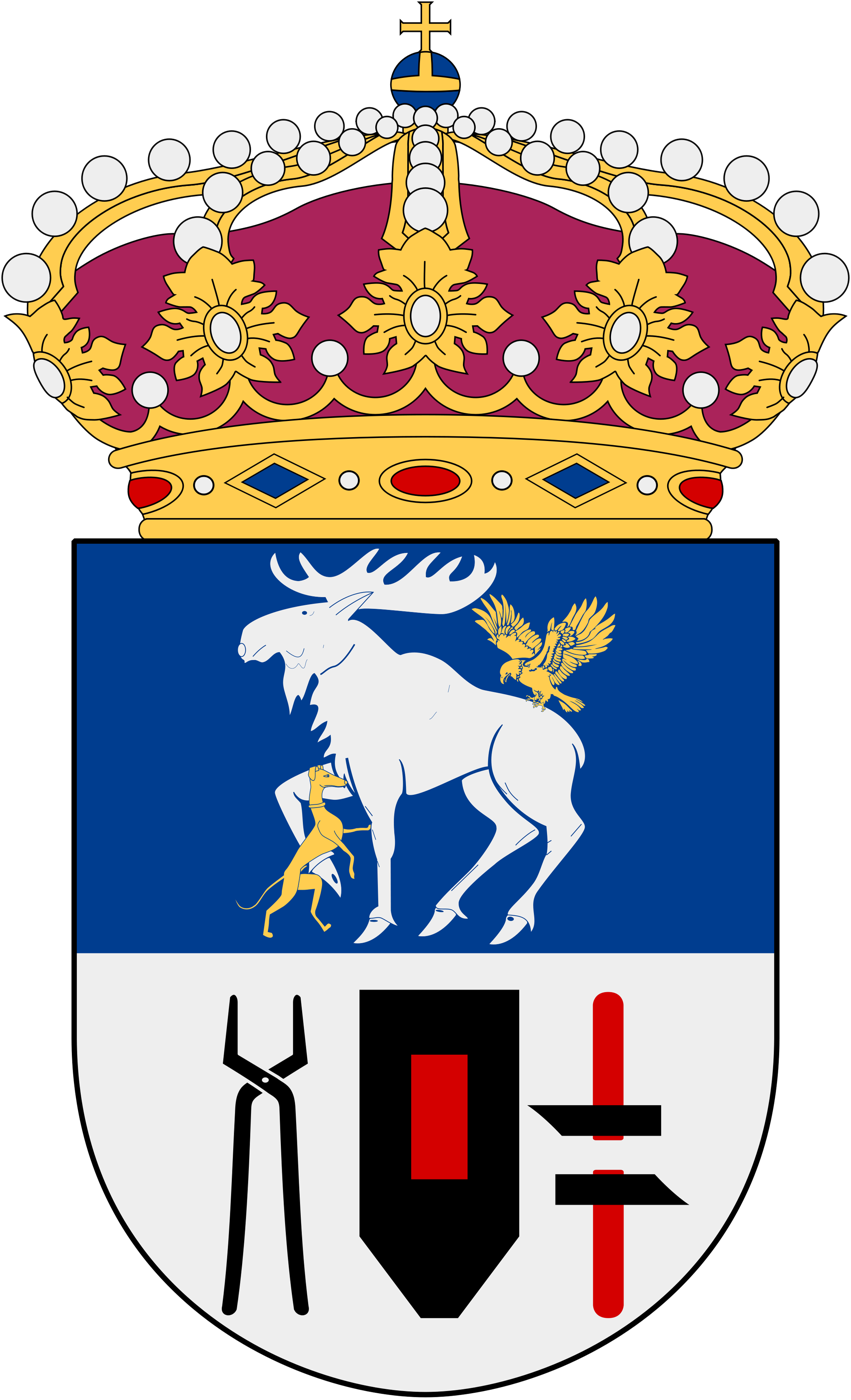
- Coat of arms of Jämtland County Administrative Board.

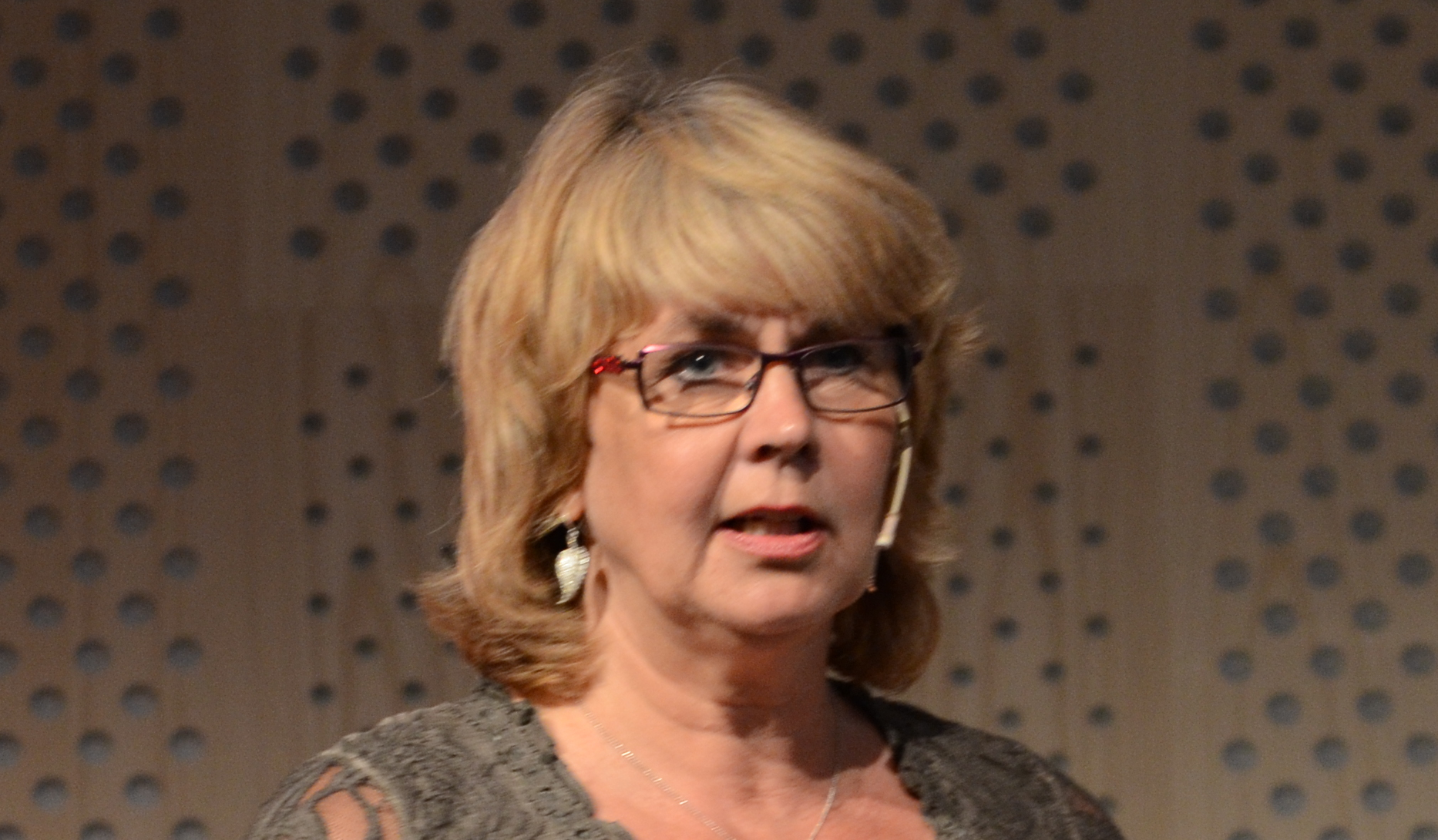
- Incumbent; Marita Ljung since 1 April 2021
- Jämtland County Administrative Board
- Residence: The residence in Östersund, Östersund
- Appointer: Government of Sweden
- Term length: Six years (Note: The governor is often appointed for a six-year mandate. It can be extended if the person has not reached retirement age.)
- Precursor: Governor of Västernorrland County; Governor of Gävleborg County
- Formation: 1810
- First holder: Anders Wasell
- Deputy: County Director (Länsrådet)
- Salary: SEK 97,800/month (2017)
- Website: Governor Jöran Hägglund

This is a list of governors for Jämtland County of Sweden, from 1810 to present. Jämtland and Härjedalen was separated from Västernorrland County and Gävleborg County in 1810 to form the new county, see List of governors of Västernorrland County, List of governors of Gävleborg County before that date.

The governor has the title landshövding in Swedish. The governor is appointed by the government, and presides over the "County Administrative Board" (länsstyrelse). The governor's office is administrative by nature, which is also hinted at by the now obsolete title "the King's Deputy" (Konungens befallningshavande) and traditionally used as an honourable post for politicians to conclude their careers.

- Anders Wasell (1810–1817)
- Lars Arnell (1817–1818)
- Michael von Törne (1818–1841)
- Gustaf Montgomery (1841–1842)
- Lars Magnus Lagerheim (1842–1843)
- Carl Printzensköld (1843–1844)
- Anders Peter Sandströmer (1844–1848)
- Jacob Axel Dahlström (1848–1859)
- Nils Axel Bennich (1860–1865)
- Gustaf Lagercrantz (1865–1866)
- Gustaf Asplund (1866–1882)
- John Philip Ericson (1883–1895)
- Knut Sparre (1895–1906)
- Johan Widén (1906–1923)
- Sigfrid Linnér (1923–1930)
- Mortimer Munck af Rosenschöld (1931–1938)
- Torsten Löfgren (1938–1953)
- Anders Tottie (1954–1969)
- Hans Gustafsson (1969–1977)
- Harald Pettersson (1977–1983)
- Sven Heurgren (1984–1995)
- Kristina Persson (1995–2001)
- Maggi Mikaelsson (2002–2008)
- Britt Bohlin Olsson (2008–2014)
- Jöran Hägglund (2014–2021)
- Susanna Löfgren (acting; 2020–2021)
- Marita Ljung (2021–present)
