= Alsen, Sweden =

Parish in Jämtland, Sweden

Coordinates: 63°23′9″N 13°55′42″E

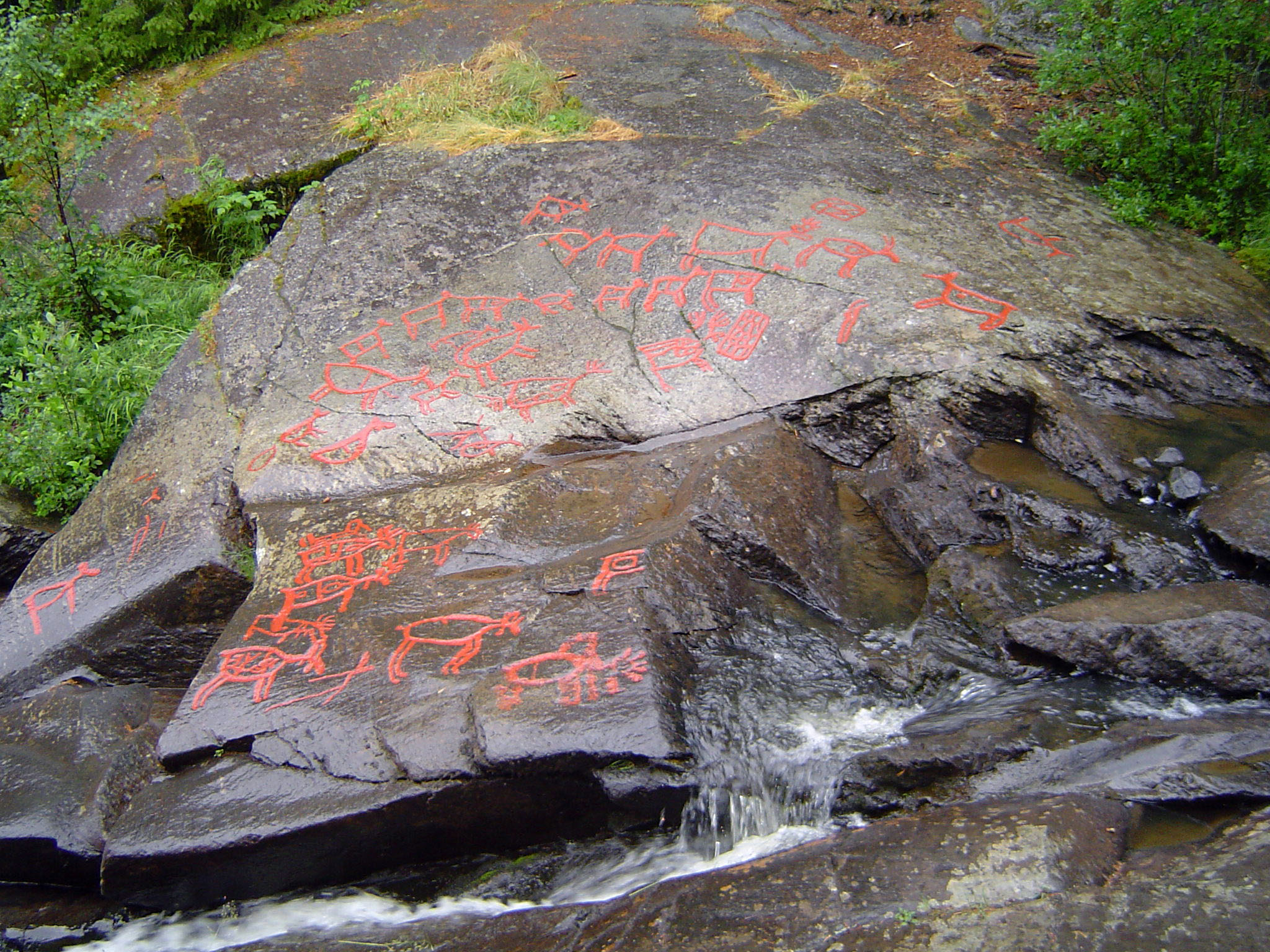
Petroglyphs in Glösa

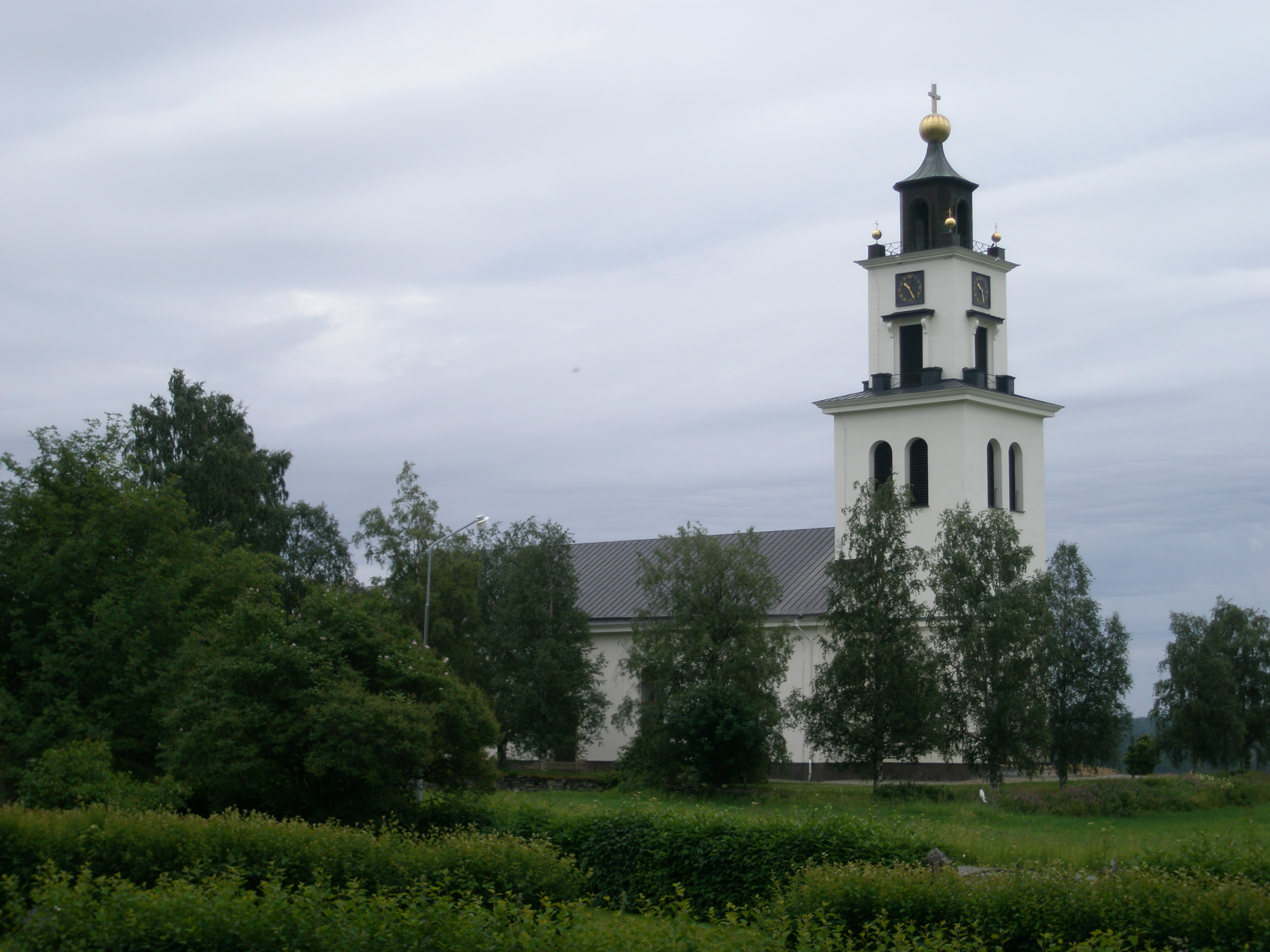
The church of Alsen

Alsen is a parish (so called socken) and former municipality (pop. 1,274) in Krokom Municipality, Jämtland in the middle of Sweden. The seat of the former municipality Alsen, Hov, is situated 50 kilometres northwest of Östersund, the capital of Jämtland.

== History ==
Jämtland has over 20 000 documented ancient monuments. Petroglyphs in Glösa in the centre of Alsen were made approximately 6 000 years ago.

Alsen and other parts of Jämtland were Christianized in the middle of the 11th century. From 1178 to 1645 Alsen was a part of Norway. In 1645 Sweden received Alsen as a part of the Treaty of Brömsebro.

Alsen is a genuine agricultural area with a long history. In today’s Alsen, farming is less important, but is still an important part of the local culture. There are small industries in Trångsviken on the lake Storsjön, for example Trangia AB which produces alcohol-burning portable stoves.

Alsen is situated on the European route E14 from Trondheim to Sundsvall.

== Localities ==
- Alsen (Hov)
- Bleckåsen
- Glösa
- Kluk
- Kougsta
- Trångsviken
- Valne
- Vången

== Sports ==
The following sports clubs are located in Alsen:

- Alsens IF
