= Nälden =

- Locality
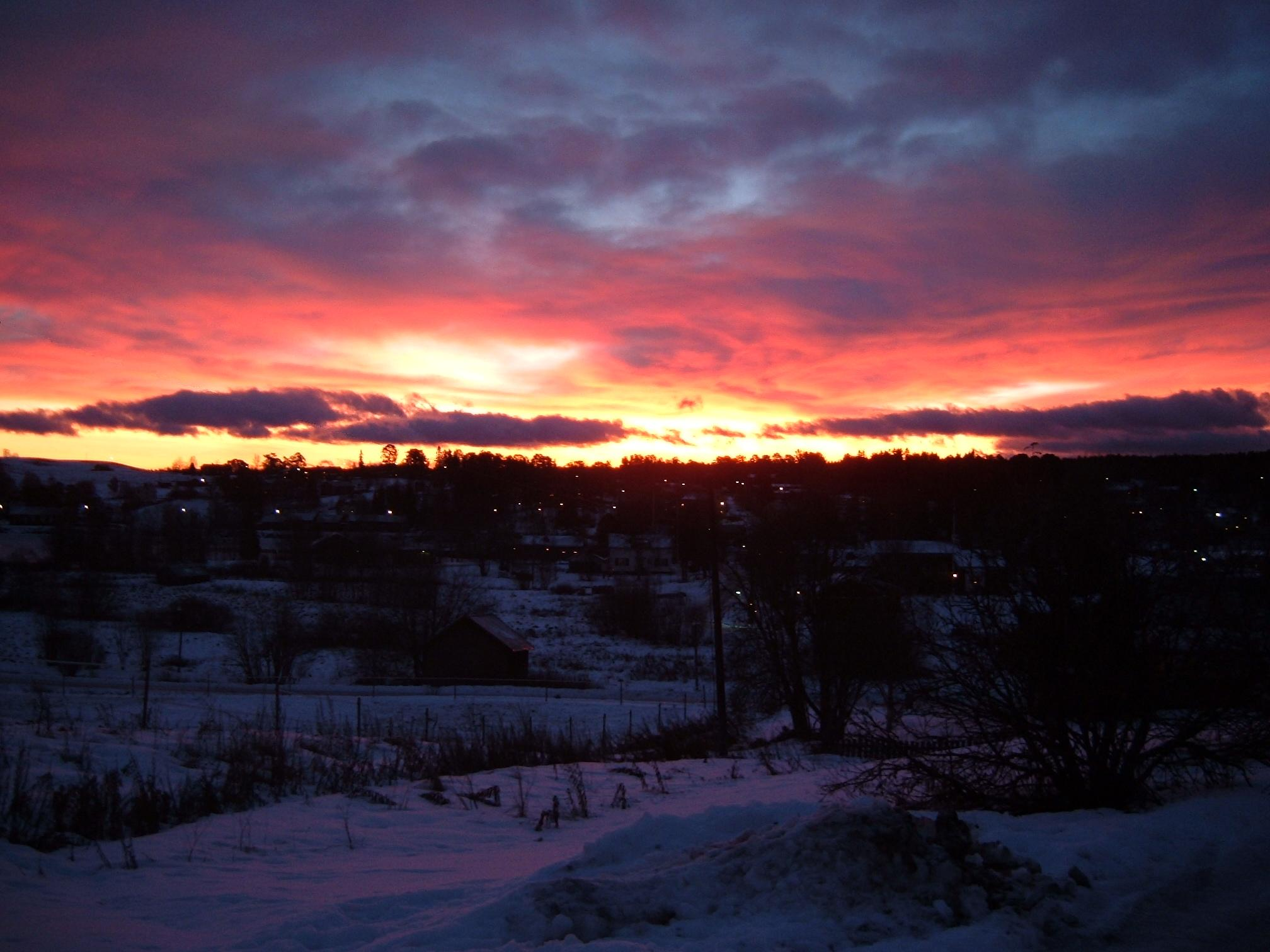
- Nälden in December 2004

- Location within Jämtland Location within Sweden
- Coordinates: 63°21′N 14°15′E
- Country: Sweden
- Province: Jämtland
- County: Jämtland County
- Municipality: Krokom Municipality

Area
  - Total: 1.29 km^{2} (0.50 sq mi)

Population (31 December 2010)
  - Total: 873
  - Density: 678/km^{2} (1,760/sq mi)
- Time zone: UTC+1 (CET)
  - Summer (DST): UTC+2 (CEST)

Nälden is a locality situated in Krokom Municipality, Jämtland County, Sweden with 873 inhabitants in 2010.
