= Jöran Hägglund =

Swedish politician

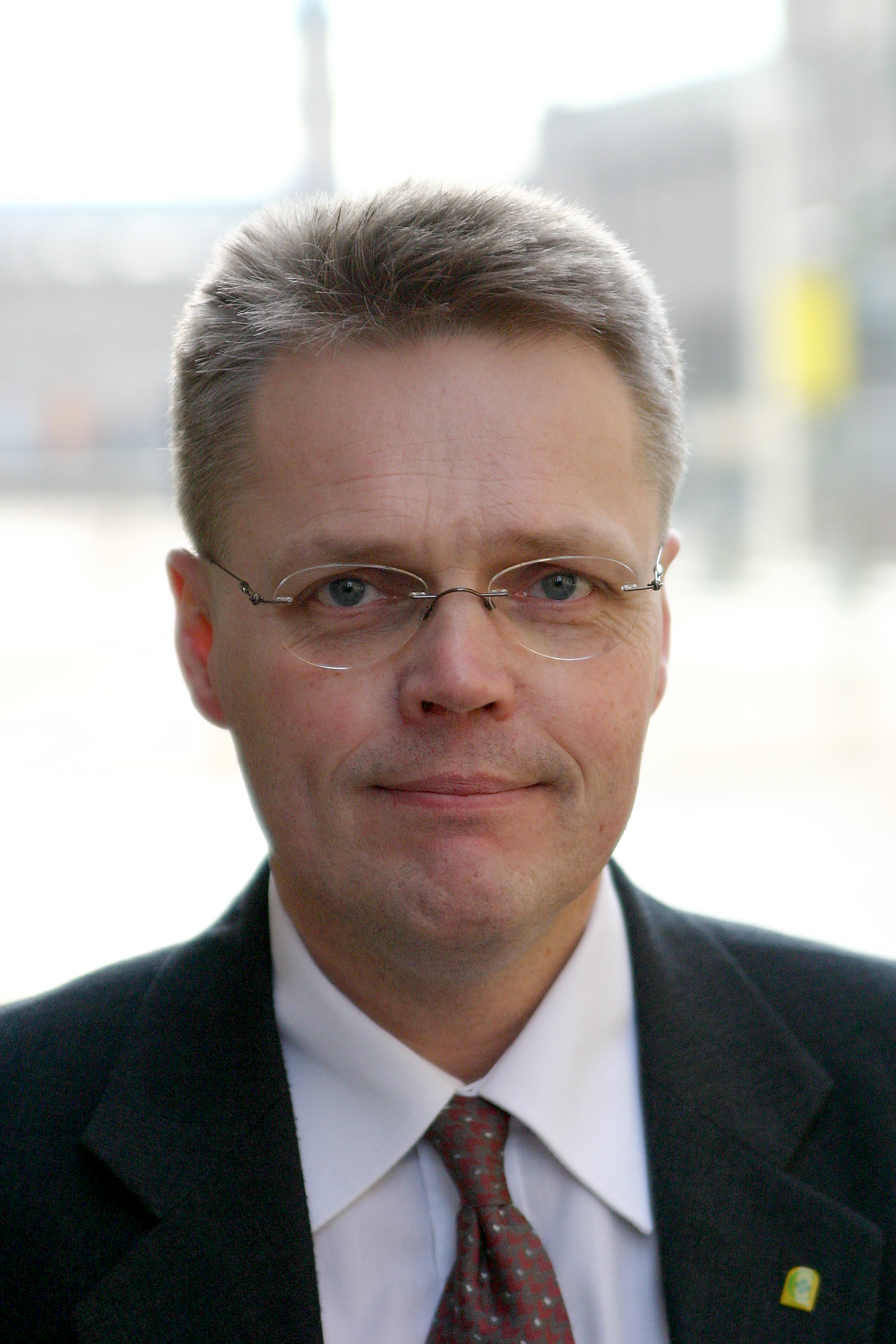
Jöran Hägglund.

Jöran Hägglund (born 29 July 1959) is a Swedish politician. He is a member of the Centre Party. Hägglund was State Secretary of Sweden at the Ministry of Enterprise, Energy and Communications. From 1 April 2014 to 1 December 2020 he was the Governor of the Jämtland County.
