= Ås IF =

Swedish football club

- Full name: Ås Idrottsförening
- Founded: 1924
- Ground: Hovängen; Ås; Sweden
- Chairman: Andreas Ehn
- League: Division 4 Jämtland/Härjedalen
Home colours

Ås IF is a Swedish football club located in Ås near Östersund.

== Background ==
Ås IF currently plays in Division 4 Jämtland/Härjedalen which is the sixth tier of Swedish football. They play their home matches at the Hovängen in Ås.

The club is affiliated to Jämtland-Härjedalens Fotbollförbund.

== Season to season ==
Season	Level	Division	Section	Position	Movements
2006*	Tier 6	Division 4	Jämtland/Härjedalen	7th	
2007	Tier 6	Division 4	Jämtland/Härjedalen	7th	
2008	Tier 6	Division 4	Jämtland/Härjedalen	9th	
2009	Tier 6	Division 4	Jämtland/Härjedalen	9th	
2010	Tier 6	Division 4	Jämtland/Härjedalen	9th	
2011	Tier 6	Division 4	Jämtland/Härjedalen	11th	Relegated

* League restructuring in 2006 resulted in a new division being created at Tier 3 and subsequent divisions dropping a level.
