= Glösa =

Coordinates: 63.38059°N 14.01187°E

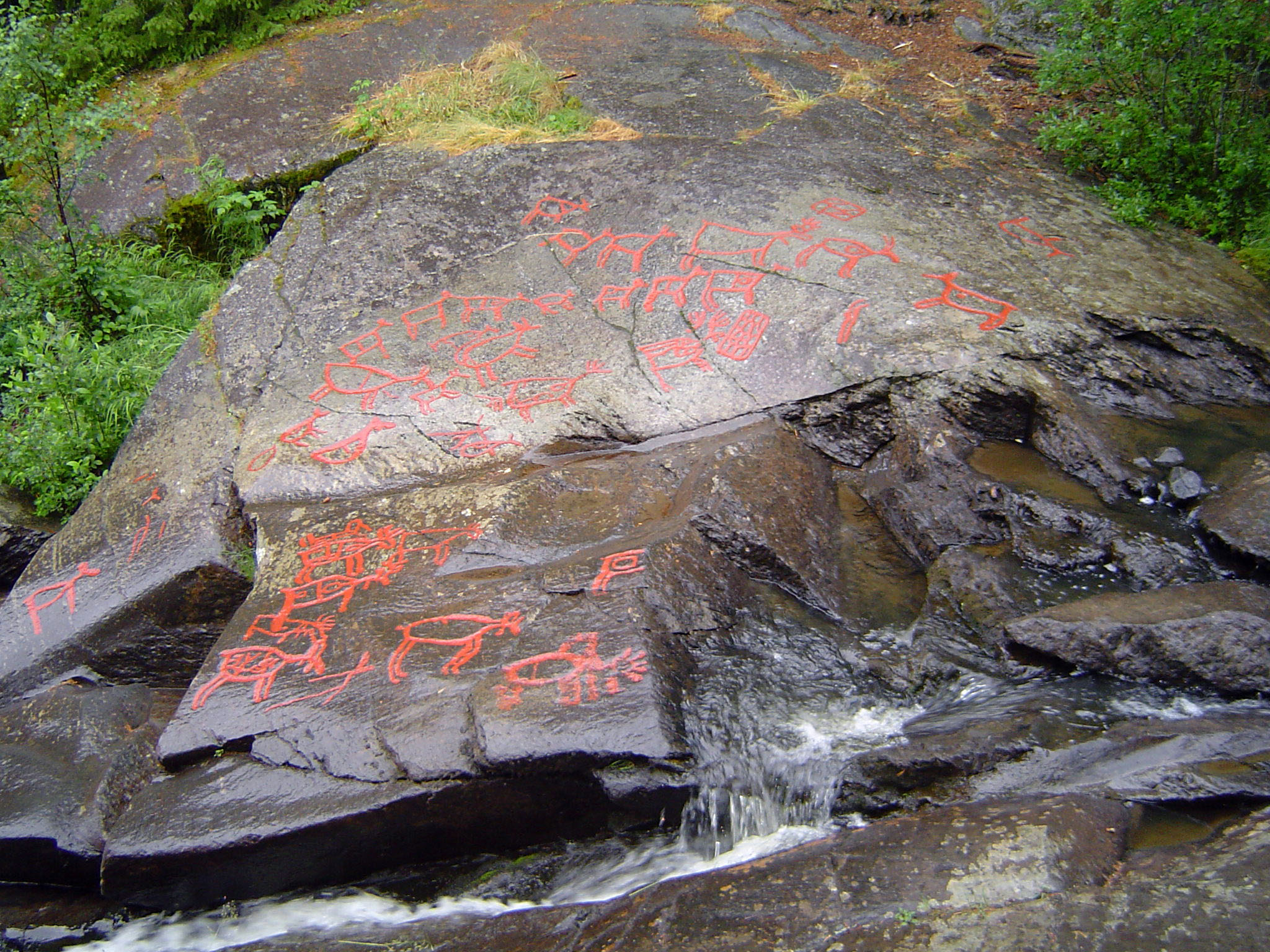
Petroglyphs in Glösa, Alsen, Sweden

Glösa is a locality in Alsen in the historical province Jämtland in the middle of Sweden. Glösa is situated in Krokom Municipality, 50 kilometres northwest of Östersund, the capital of Jämtland. Glösa is a village in an agricultural area and has a long history.

Petroglyphs in Glösa were made approximately 5 000 years ago. The carvings consist of moose and were first described in 1685.

== Gallery ==
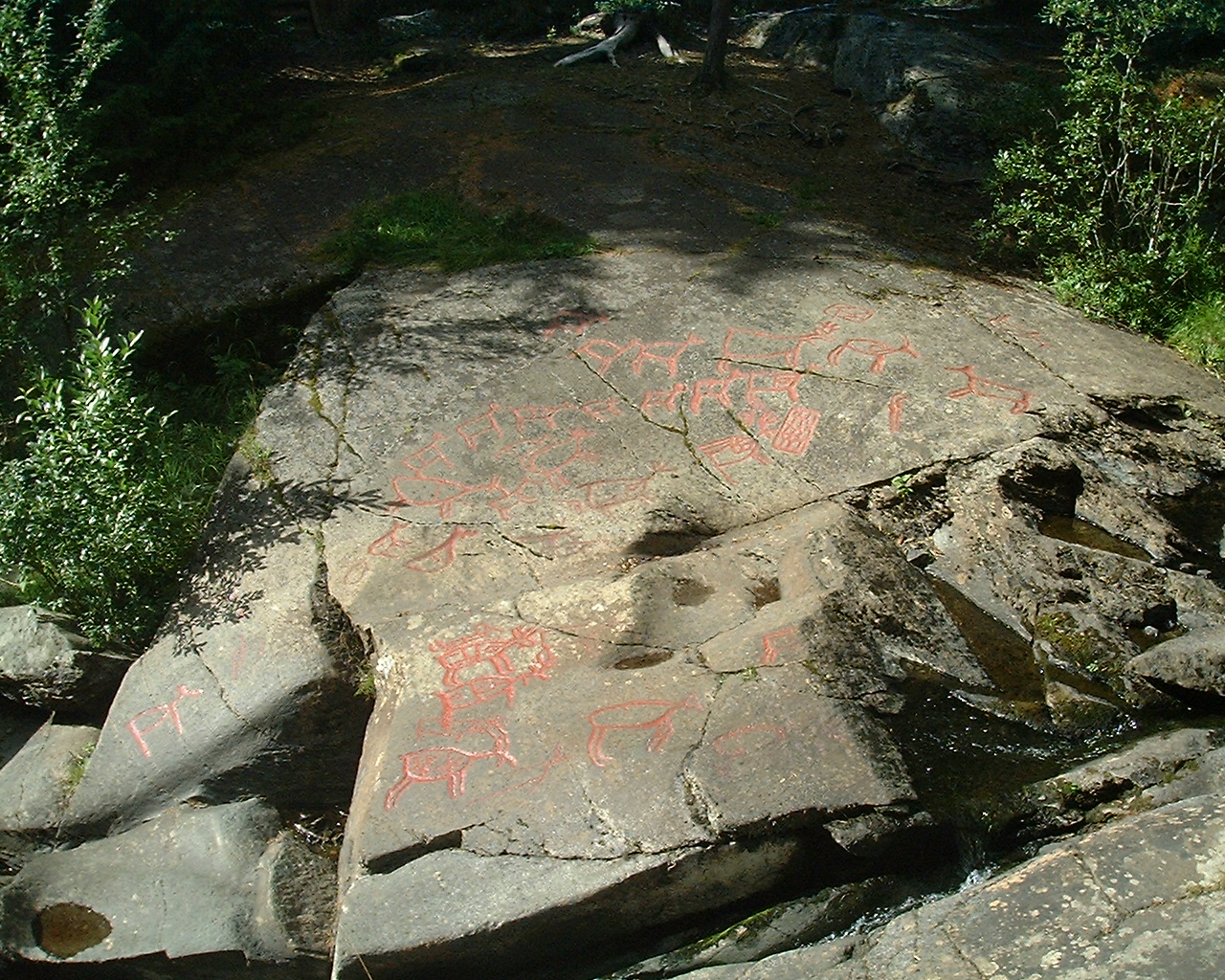
Petroglyphs in Glösa

A moose from Glösa forms the coat of arms of Krokom Municipality
