= Aspås =

- Locality
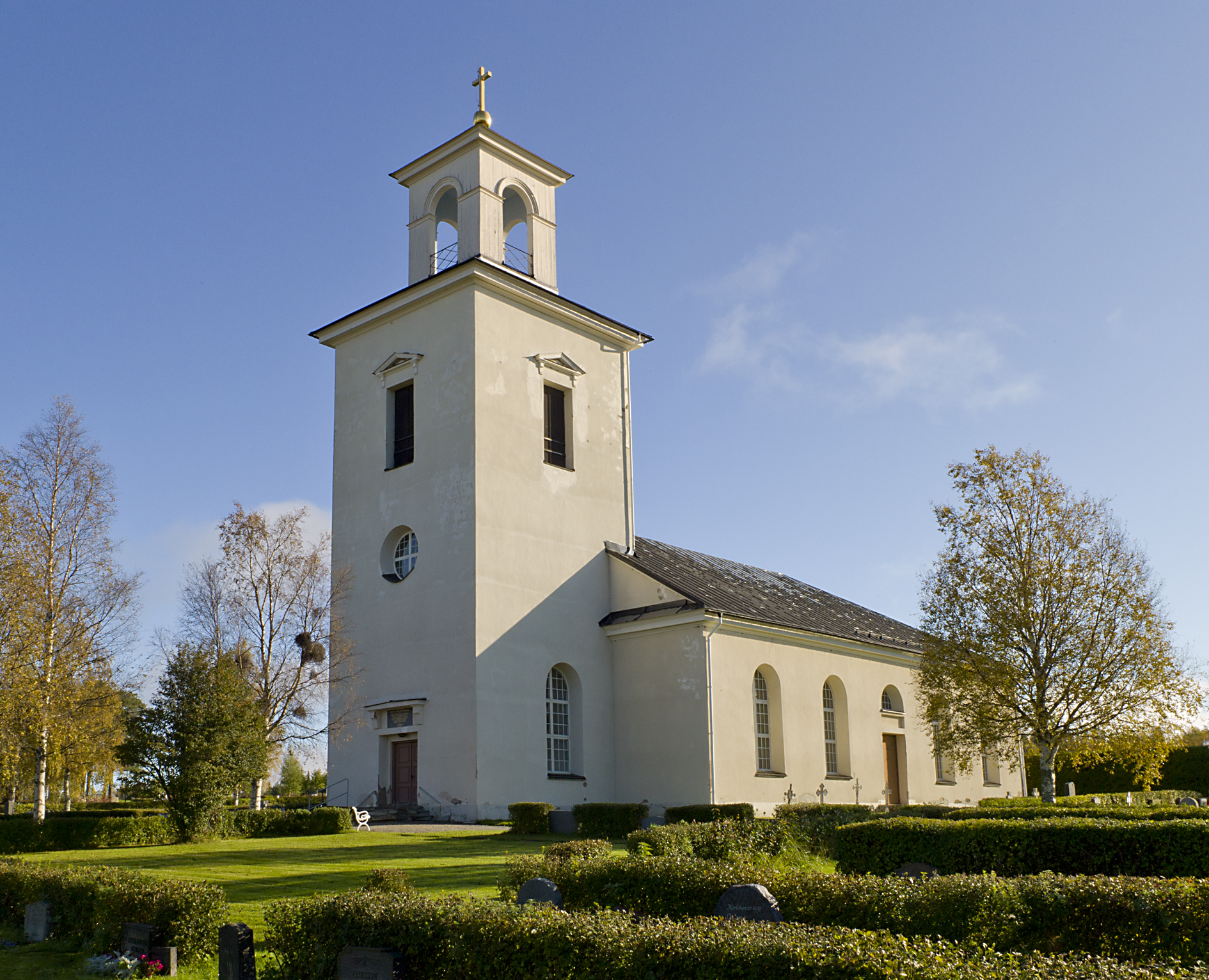
- Church in Aspås, shown in 2011

- Location within Jämtland Location within Sweden
- Coordinates: 63°22′N 14°30′E
- Country: Sweden
- Province: Jämtland
- County: Jämtland County
- Municipality: Krokom Municipality

Area
  - Total: 0.62 km^{2} (0.24 sq mi)

Population (31 December 2010)
  - Total: 375
  - Density: 604/km^{2} (1,560/sq mi)
- Time zone: UTC+1 (CET)
  - Summer (DST): UTC+2 (CEST)

Aspås (from Old Norse Öspáss 'aspen ridge') is a locality situated in Krokom Municipality, Jämtland County, Sweden with 375 inhabitants in 2010.
