= Jamtamót =

Medieval parliamentary assembly of Jämtland

Jamtamót was the parliamentary assembly of Jämtland, a historical province (landskap) in the center of modern-day Sweden in northern Europe. Founded in the first half of the 10th century, it was one of the oldest elected assemblies in the world. All male inhabitants of Jämtland province were allowed to attend, making the gathered congregation rather large compared to the Jämtland population. Jamtamót was held annually the week of 12 March, during the week of motsveckan, Jämtland's biggest market.

== Etymology ==
Unlike other Scandinavian assemblies, it is referred to as a mót, not þing, both meaning 'assembly'. The word mót is found in e.g. the political institution Witenagemot in Anglo-Saxon England.

== Function ==
The Jamtamót was the highest authority in Jämtland during the time it was most prominent. Disputes were settled and judgments given in criminal cases. In addition, the assembly worked as a kind of government in relation to other Scandinavian lagting areas, as the council decided on tax issues. The Jamtamót initially had no king over it, and hence Jämtland in the period before 1178 is regarded as a peasant republic. All free men had to participate, and the most prominent men in the different families deliberated and jointly discussed various issues concerning the country. Decisions on important matters were taken, enhanced by asking and informing everyone assembled. There are theories that the Jamtamót decided to turn Jämtland to Christianity during the 1000s, shortly after the Battle of Stiklestad.

== History ==
There is some evidence that the population of Viking Age Scandinavia strived to reproduce the “ideal assembly site”, described in Eddic poetry.

The Jamtamót continued to operate after falling under Norwegian control with the loss at the Battle of Storsjön in 1178. Even when Norway was centralized, the Jamtamót continued. When the Kalmar Union was formed, and Jämtland ended up far from the central power, the althing again increased its significance. In the late 15th century, the Jamtamót was a Norwegian Legislative Assembly. It lost its status as a judicial body but was not abolished, and Jämtland came to have two parallel assemblies.

In the 16th century, Jämtland became a Dano–Norwegian county. After the Swedish occupation of Jämtland in the Northern Seven Years' War (1564–1570), King Christian IV forbade the assembly, but it continued to exist in secret and in the protection of the market week.

After Jämtland became Swedish in 1645, parts of the Jamtamót were transferred to a Swedish rural summer assembly called Jämtland landsjämnadsting.

== See also ==
- Althing
- Jämtland
