= Skäckerfjällen Nature Reserve =

Nature reserve in Jämtland, Sweden

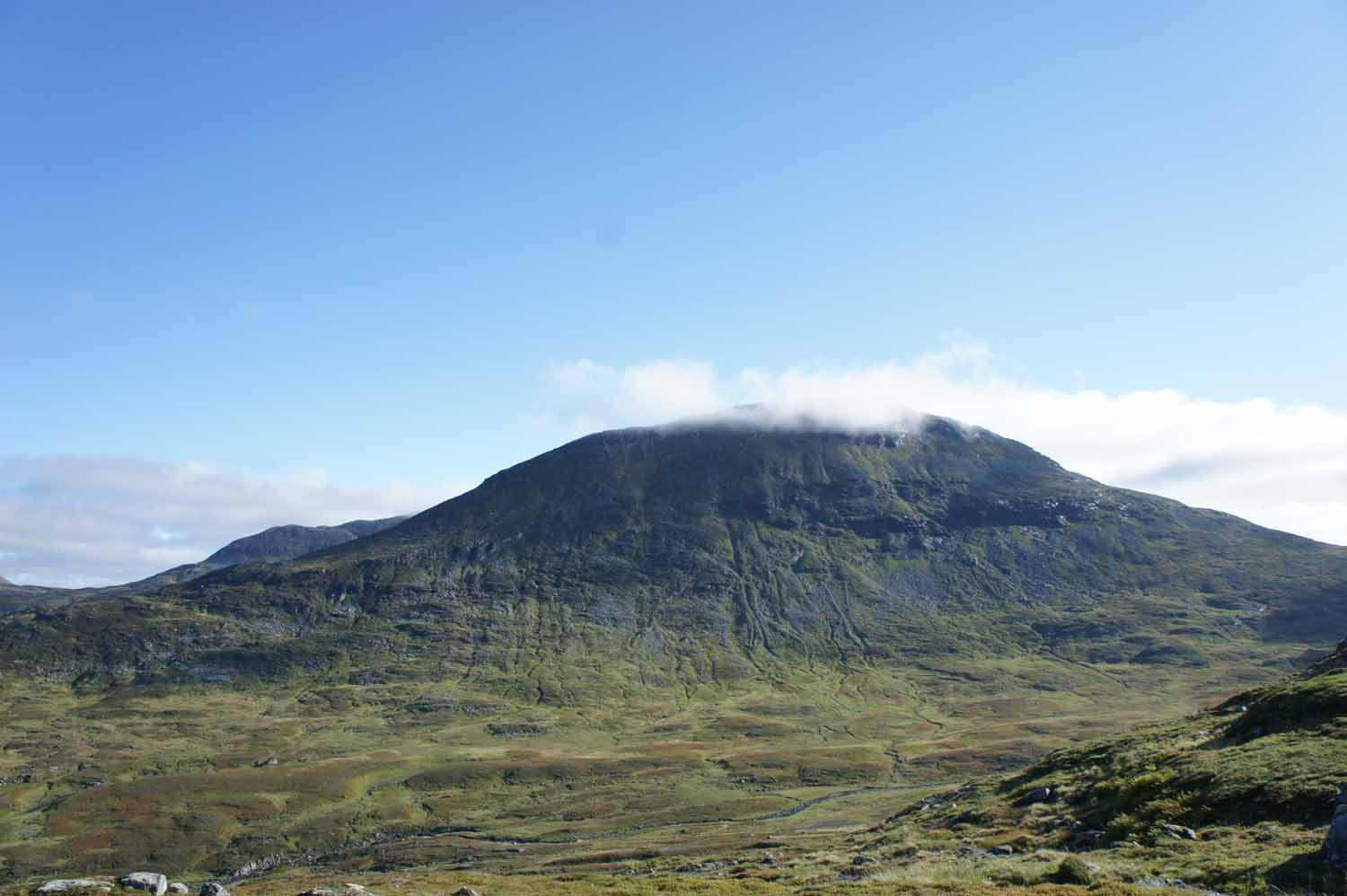
- Sockertoppen, one of the peaks in the area

- Location within Jämtland Location within Sweden
- Location: Sweden
- Nearest city: Åre
- Coordinates: 63°50′09″N 12°41′38″E
- Area: 470 km^{2} (120,000 acres)
- Established: 1988

Skäckerfjällen Nature Reserve (Swedish: Skäckerfjällens naturreservat) is a nature reserve in Jämtland County in Sweden.

Skäckerfjällen literally means "The Skäcker mountains" and the large nature reserve covers this whole range, which is part of the Scandinavian Mountains. The highest peak is Sandfjället with an altitude of 1,230 m (4,040 ft). It is a mountain landscape of a kind typical for the Scandinavian mountain range. Within the area, three old-growth forests exist which are rather different from each other. In the Strådalen area close to the border with Norway, the old-growth forest is dominated by large spruce trees, while in the area around Lake Lågsjön the forest is dominated by Scots pine, often in the form of krummholz. In Rutsdalen area, old-growth forest dominated by spruce is separated from mixed coniferous old-growth forest which grow on thin moraine.

Two traditional mountain farms exist in the area. Their continuous existence has generated a cultural landscape with high biodiversity.

The area is used by the Sami population for reindeer grazing all year around.
