= Espas, Gers =

Espas
- Commune
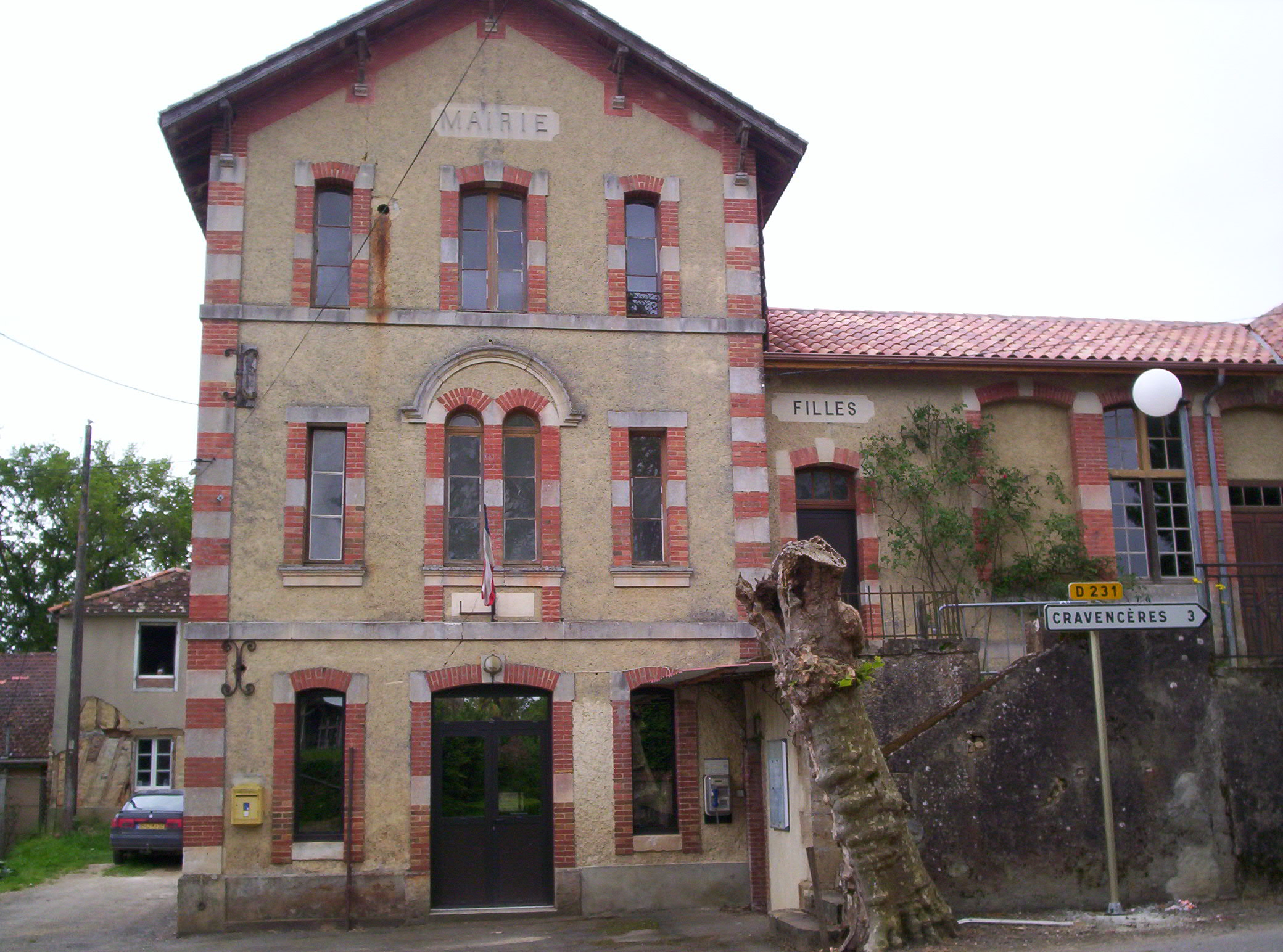
- Town hall
- Location of Espas
- Location within France Location within Occitanie
- Coordinates: 43°46′55″N 0°04′17″E
- Country: France
- Region: Occitania
- Department: Gers
- Arrondissement: Condom
- Canton: Grand-Bas-Armagnac

Government
  - Mayor (2020–2026): Pierre Cazères
- Area^{1}: 15.13 km^{2} (5.84 sq mi)
- Elevation: 217 m (712 ft)
- Highest elevation: 221 m (725 ft)
- Lowest elevation: 119 m (390 ft)
- Population (2023): 136
  - Density: 8.99/km^{2} (23.3/sq mi)
- Time zone: UTC+01:00 (CET)
  - Summer (DST): UTC+02:00 (CEST)
- INSEE/Postal code: 32125 /32370
- ^{1} French Land Register data, which excludes lakes, ponds, glaciers > 1 km^{2} (0.386 sq mi or 247 acres) and river estuaries.

Espas is a commune in the Gers department in southwestern France.

== Geography ==
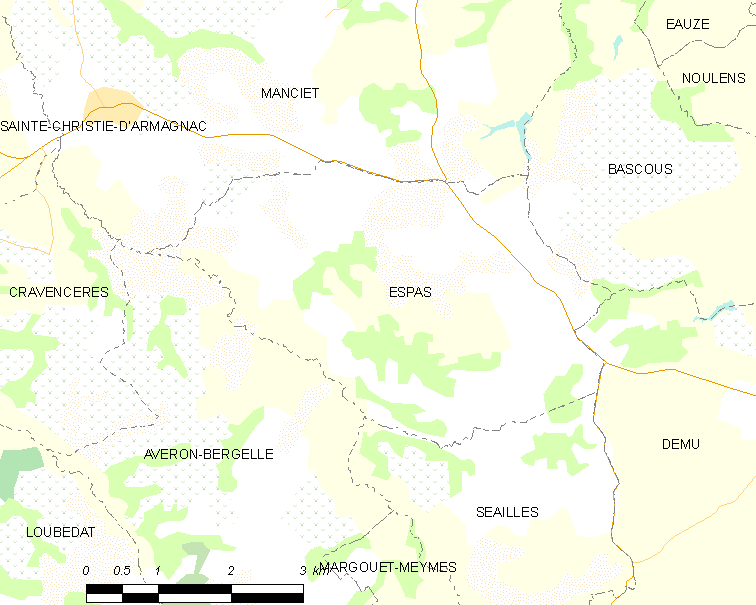
Espas and its surrounding communes

== Population ==
Historical population
Year	Pop.	±% p.a.
1968	188	—
1975	183	−0.38%
1982	151	−2.71%
1990	132	−1.67%
1999	124	−0.69%
2007	118	−0.62%
2012	118	+0.00%
2017	123	+0.83%
2023	136	+1.69%
Source: INSEE

== See also ==
- Communes of the Gers department
