= Krokom =

- Locality
- Location within Jämtland Location within Sweden
- Coordinates: 63°19′N 14°30′E
- Country: Sweden
- Province: Jämtland
- County: Jämtland County
- Municipality: Krokom Municipality

Area
  - Total: 2.63 km^{2} (1.02 sq mi)

Population (31 December 2010)
  - Total: 2,277
  - Density: 866/km^{2} (2,240/sq mi)
- Time zone: UTC+1 (CET)
  - Summer (DST): UTC+2 (CEST)

Krokom (from Old Norse krókar, dat. krókum, 'bends [of the Indalsälven river]') is a locality and the seat of Krokom Municipality in Jämtland County, Sweden with 2,277 inhabitants in 2010.

Krokom is situated about 20 km northwest of Östersund along European route E14 (E14). It is located at the junction where E14, County Road 340 / County Road 339 and County Road 615 meet. Railroad service passage through Krokom started in 1882. The one-way railway bridge from 1927 was shut down in connection with the record-high spring flood in 1995. A new bridge downstream of the old one, which was demolished, was opened in 1997. The municipal building (Kommunhuset) was built in the early 1970 when several smaller municipalities were merged into Krokom Municipality.

== Gallery ==
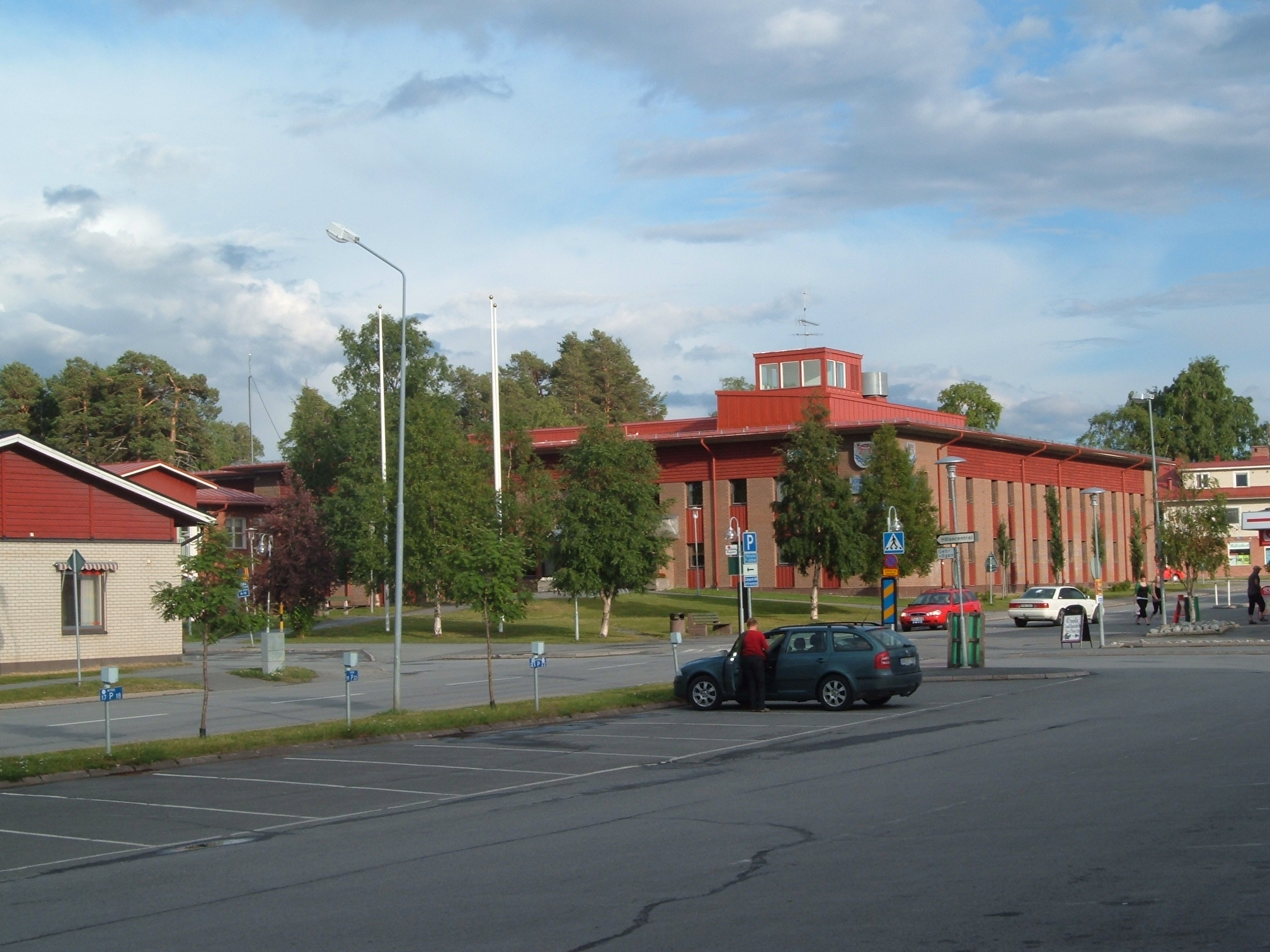
Krokom Municipal Building

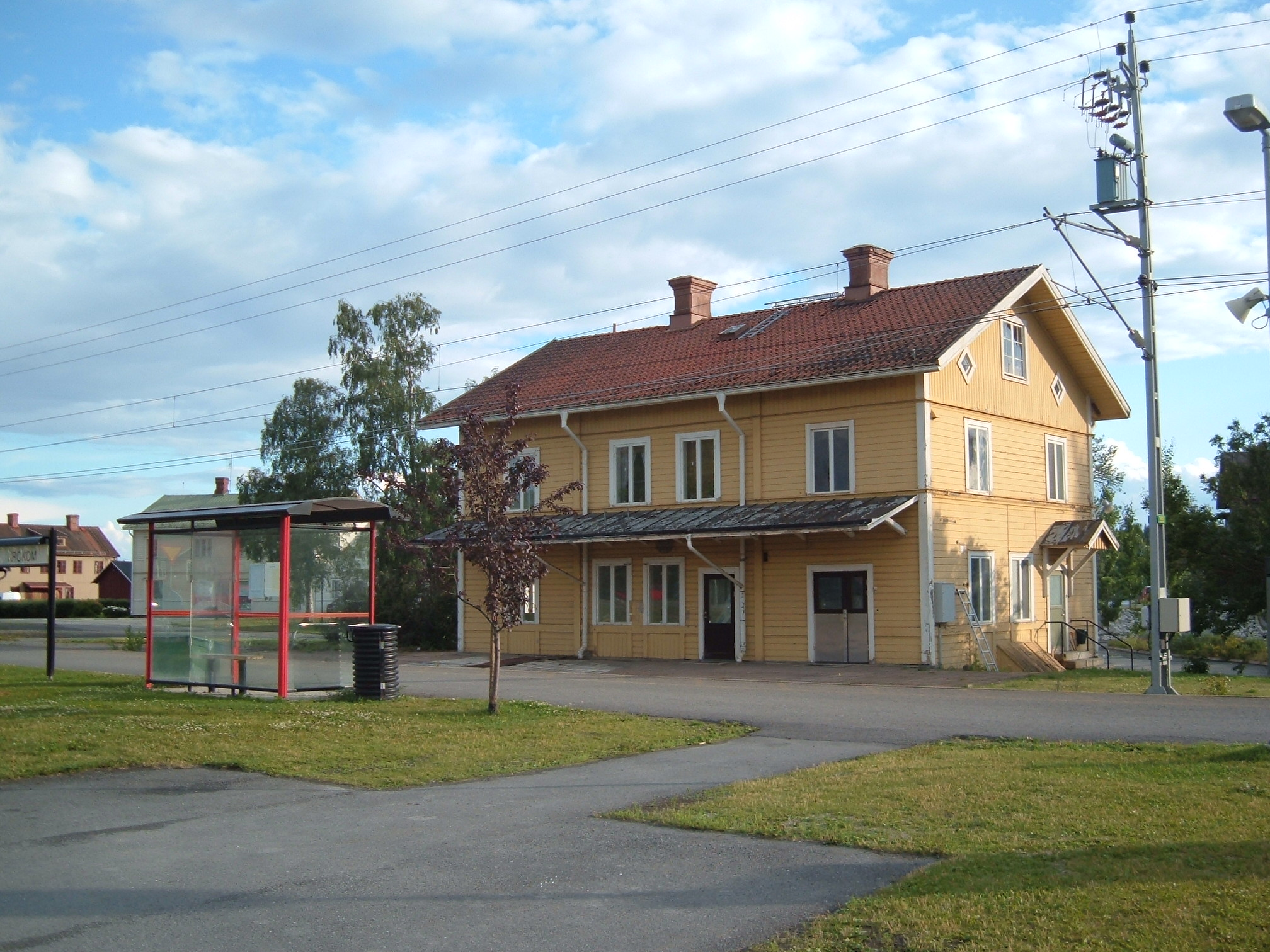
Krokom Train Station
