= Battle of Storsjön =

1178 battle

Date	1178
Location	Strait between Andersön and Sunne in Storsjöbygden, Jämtland 63°7′45″N 14°25′30″E
Result	Norwegian victory: Norway takes control of Jamtland

Belligerents
Jämtland	(Kingdom of Norway (872–1397)) Norway

Commanders and leaders
Unknown	Sverre Sigurdsson

Strength
1,200 men	100 men

Casualties and losses
- 100 dead

The Battle of Storsjön (Slaget på Storsjöns is) was fought during 1178 outside Sunne, in Jämtland province, Sweden. The battle was won by the Birkebeiner army of King Sverre of Norway.

The battle was conducted near Lake Storsjön, which was then covered with ice. Due to darkness, Sverre and his troops pulled away while local peasants fought against each other. When dawn came, the Birkebeiner forces attacked and won a victory. As a consequences of this defeat, Jämtland was incorporated into Norway until it was ceded to Sweden in 1645.

According to the Sverris saga, the Jamts were mostly killed by sword blows in their backs. This is supported by archaeological findings from the 20th century.
