= Krokom Municipality =

Krokom Municipality Krokoms kommun
- Municipality
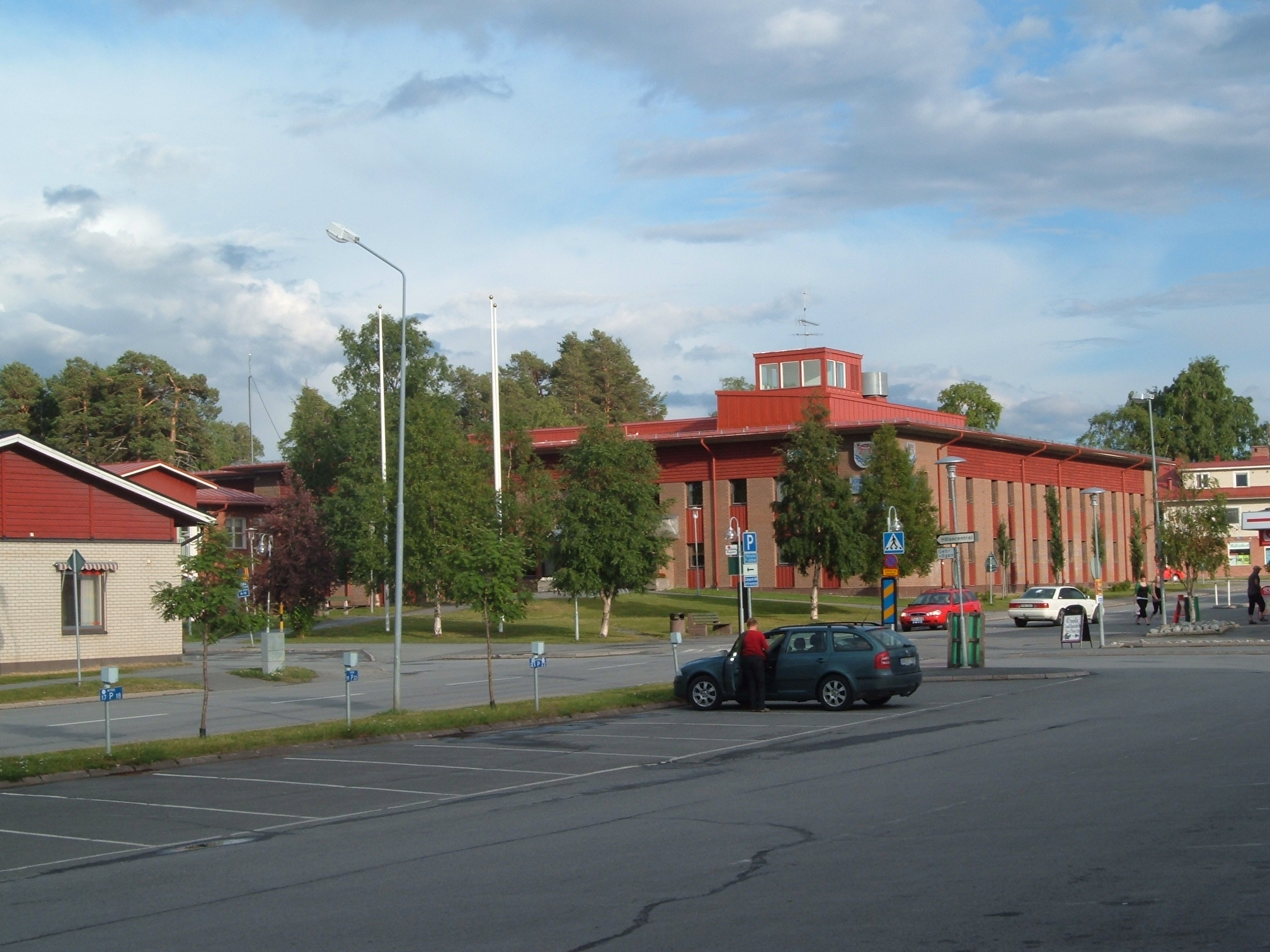
- Krokom town hall

- Coat of arms

- Coordinates: 63°19′N 14°30′E
- Country: Sweden
- County: Jämtland County
- Seat: Krokom

Area
  - Total: 6,812.75 km^{2} (2,630.42 sq mi)
  - Land: 6,155.18 km^{2} (2,376.53 sq mi)
  - Water: 657.57 km^{2} (253.89 sq mi)
- Area as of 1 January 2014.

Population (30 June 2025)
  - Total: 15,712
  - Density: 2.5526/km^{2} (6.6113/sq mi)
- Time zone: UTC+1 (CET)
  - Summer (DST): UTC+2 (CEST)
- ISO 3166 code: SE
- Province: Jämtland
- Municipal code: 2309
- Website: www.krokom.se

Krokom Municipality (Swedish: Krokoms kommun, Southern Sami: Krokomen tjïelte) is a municipality in Jämtland County in northern Sweden. Its seat is located in Krokom.

The present municipality was formed in 1974, when the former municipalities of Alsen, Föllinge, Offerdal and Rödön were amalgamated. The number of original local government entities in the area is nine, and amalgamations had also taken place in 1952 and 1969.

== Localities ==
There are eleven localities (or urban areas) in Krokom Municipality:

#	Locality	Population
1	**Krokom**	2,087
2	Ås	1,097
3	Nälden	881
4	Föllinge	509
5	Dvärsätt	437
5	Östersund (part of)	437
7	Änge	387
8	Aspås	352
9	Trångsviken	269
10	Vaplan	259
11	Ytterån	203

The municipal seat is shown in bold

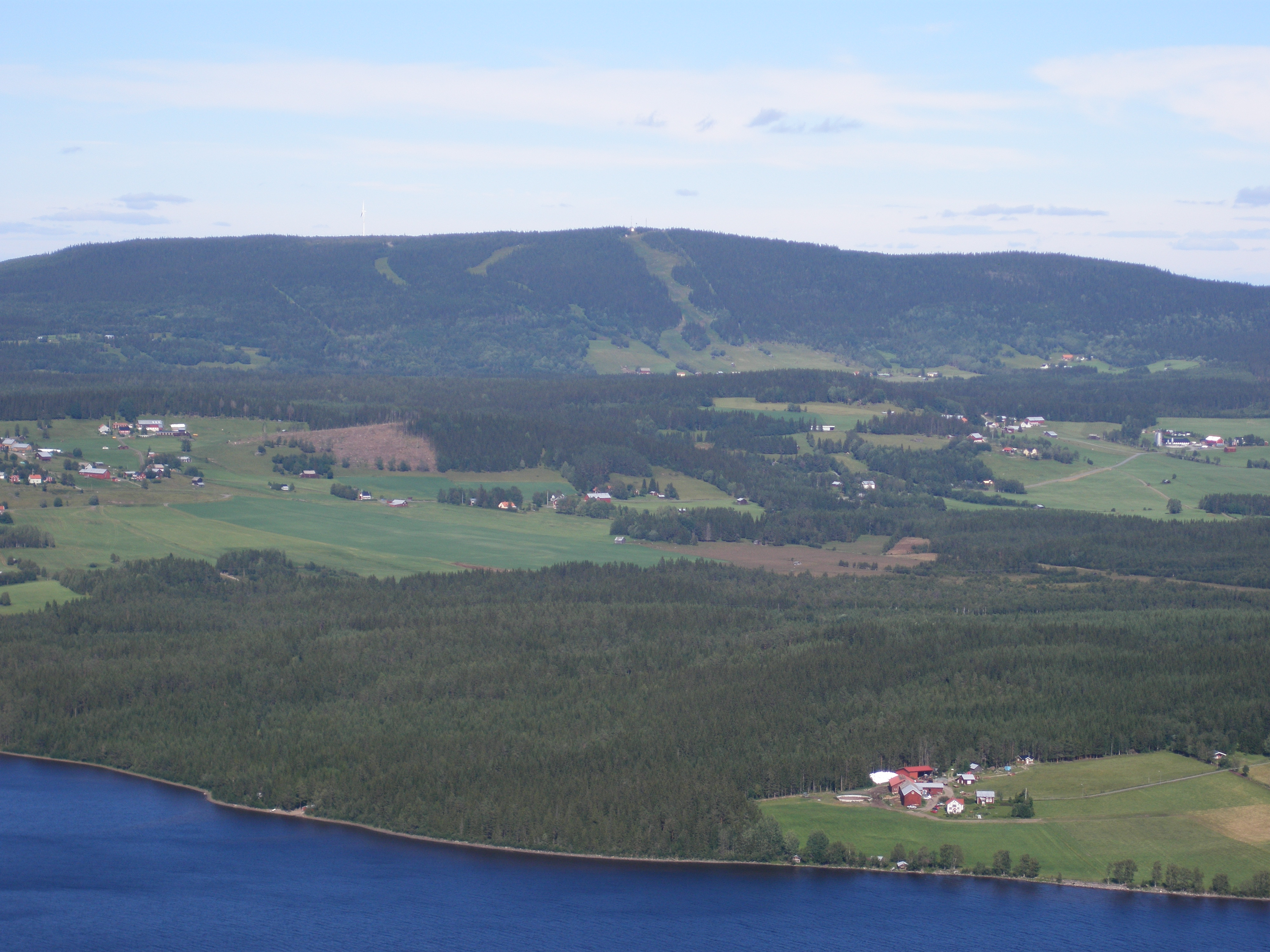
View from Hällberget in Offerdal.

=== Villages ===
- Flykälen
- Kaxås
- Rönnöfors

== Demographics ==
This is a demographic table based on Krokom Municipality's electoral districts in the 2022 Swedish general election sourced from SVT's election platform, in turn taken from SCB official statistics.

In total there were 11,366 Swedish citizens of voting age resident in the municipality. 54.0% voted for the left coalition and 44.8% for the right coalition. Indicators are in percentage points except population totals and income.

Location	Residents	Citizen adults	Left vote	Right vote	Employed	Swedish parents	Foreign heritage	Income SEK	Degree
Location			%	%					
Alsenbygden	1,221	935	53.0	45.7	86	93	7	24,115	30
Aspås	1,066	798	45.3	54.1	93	97	3	28,778	38
Dvärsätt	1,388	1,004	52.6	46.7	88	96	4	29,239	41
Föllinge-Laxsjö	1,543	1,245	50.7	47.5	81	90	10	21,164	22
Krokom	1,973	1,487	55.7	43.0	77	83	17	22,033	27
Nälden	1,818	1,255	51.0	47.9	86	87	13	25,664	35
Offerdalsbygden	2,010	1,574	52.5	46.6	87	92	8	23,444	28
Rödöbygden	748	590	57.1	42.0	92	96	4	30,554	54
Ås Norra	2,054	1,590	62.0	36.9	88	93	7	30,718	60
Ås Södra	1,528	888	58.6	40.9	93	93	7	32,996	61
Source: SVT

== Sports ==
The following sports clubs are located in Krokom Municipality:

- Alsens IF
- Ås IF

== Notable people ==
- Ann-Margret (1941–), Swedish-American actress and singer
