= Jämtland County =

County (län) of Sweden

Jämtland County Jämtlands län (Swedish) Jiemthen leene (Southern Sami)
- County of Sweden
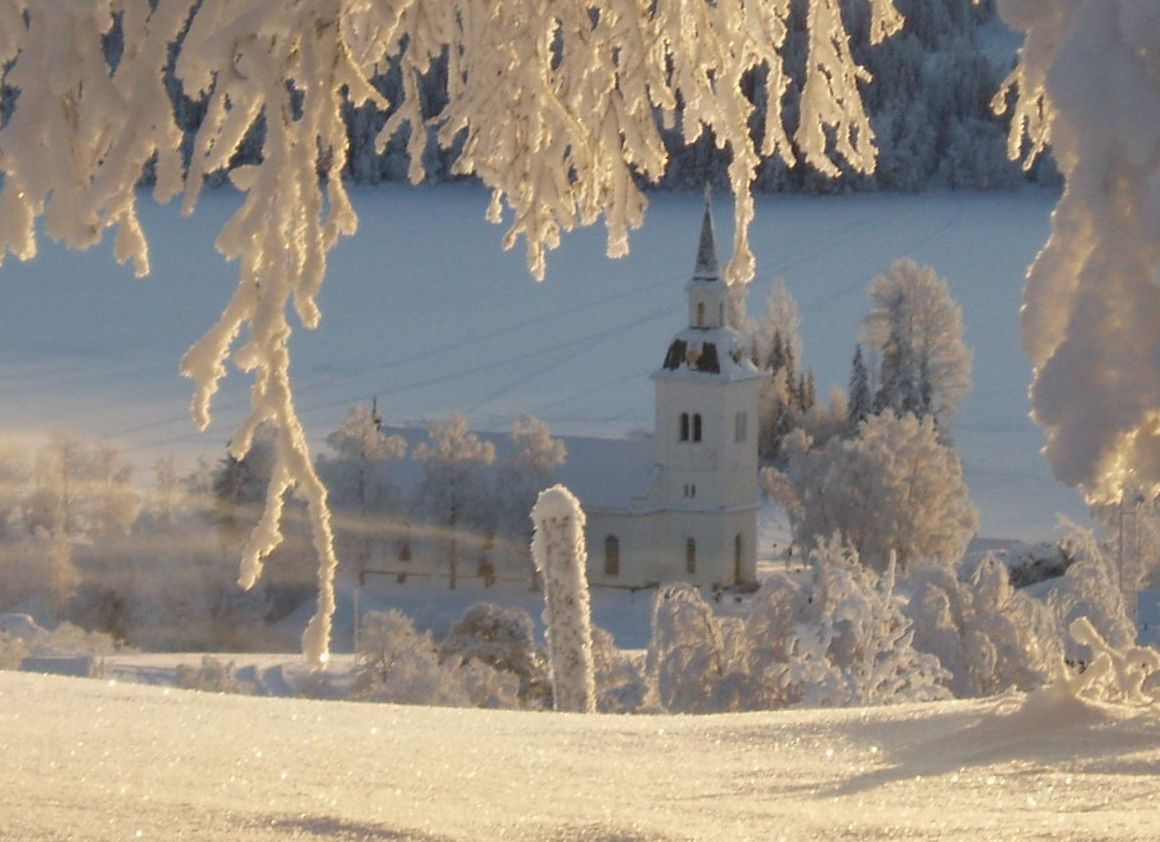

- Flag Coat of arms

- Jämtland County in Sweden

- Location map of Jämtland County in Sweden
- Coordinates: 63.35°N 14.4°E
- Country: Sweden
- Founded: 1810
- Capital: Östersund
- Municipalities: 8: Åre; Berg; Bräcke; Härjedalen; Krokom; Östersund; Ragunda; Strömsund

Government
  - Governor: Marita Ljung
  - Council: Region Jämtland Härjedalen

Area
  - Total: 49,341.2 km^{2} (19,050.7 sq mi)

Population (31 December 2023)
  - Total: 132,572
  - Density: 2.68684/km^{2} (6.95889/sq mi)

GDP
  - Total: SEK 43 billion €4.605 billion (2015)
- Time zone: UTC+1 (CET)
  - Summer (DST): UTC+2 (CEST)
- ISO 3166 code: SE-Z
- NUTS Region: SE322
- Website: www.z.lst.se

Jämtland County (Swedish: Jämtlands län, pronounced [ˈjɛmtlɑnds ˈlɛːn]; Southern Sami: Jiemthen leene, pronounced [ˈjiemten ˈleːne]) is a county or län in Sweden. It consists of the provinces of Jämtland and Härjedalen, along with minor parts of Hälsingland and Ångermanland, plus two small strips of Lapland and Dalarna. It borders the counties of Dalarna, Gävleborg, Västernorrland, and Västerbotten, as well as the Norwegian county of Trøndelag. It measures 49,443 km^{2} (19,090 sq mi) and constitutes 12% of Sweden's total area, making it the country's third largest county. The capital is Östersund. The county governor and leader of the administrative board, as appointed by the Swedish government, has been Marita Ljung since 2021.

The county was established in 1810, at the time it consisted only of the provinces of Jämtland and Härjedalen, which is why the coat of arms is a shield parted per fess with their provincial arms. King Carl XVI Gustaf is occasionally referred to as Duke of Jämtland after his title of king.

== Province ==
Jämtland County consists of primarily the provinces of Jämtland and Härjedalen, though minor parts of Hälsingland and Ångermanland are also included, along with small uninhabited areas in Lapland and Dalarna.

Jämtland County is sparsely populated and more than one-third of the population lives in the countryside, making Jämtland County the second largest rural region in Sweden, after Gotland County.

== Administration ==
The main aim of the County Administrative Board is to fulfill the goals set in national politics by the Riksdag and the Government, to coordinate the interests and promote the development of the county, to establish regional goals and safeguard the due process of law in the handling of each case. The County Administrative Board is a Government Agency headed by a Governor. See List of Jämtland Governors.

== Politics ==
The county is dominated by the Swedish Social Democratic Party and the Centre Party, which is unique in Sweden, but corresponds to the situation in the bordering Norwegian county of Nord-Trøndelag. The county is rather contrastive in the political field. While a majority of the municipalities are governed by liberal-conservative (Swedish: borgerlig, lit. "bourgeois") majorities or by coalitions overstepping the bloc border, the county council is controlled by a red-green majority and the Social Democrats receive two out of four mandates to the Riksdag. After the Swedish county council election in 2022, the following political parties are represented in the Jämtland county council (Swedish: Region Jämtland Härjedalen):

Party	Seats	Votes	%
Social Democrats	21	30,702	36.95%
Moderate Party	9	12,941	15.57%
Centre Party	7	10,486	12.62%
Sweden Democrats	7	10,343	12.45%
Christian Democrats	5	7,280	8.76%
Left Party	4	5,992	7.21%
Green Party	2	2,688	3.23%
Liberals	-	2,101	2.53%
Alternative for Sweden	-	349	0.42%
Others	-	210	0.25%
Total	55	83,092	100%
Turnout		85,518	81.38%

== Riksdag elections ==
The table details all Riksdag election results of Jämtland County since the unicameral era began in 1970. The blocs denote which party would support the Prime Minister or the lead opposition party towards the end of the elected parliament.

Year	Turnout	Votes	V	S	MP	C	L	KD	M	SD	NyD	Left	Right
1970	86.8	80,319	3.2	49.7		24.6	11.5	1.7	8.8			53.0	44.8
1973	89.5	86,774	4.2	48.2		30.4	7.3	1.5	8.0			52.3	45.7
1976	90.4	91,474	3.8	47.9		31.7	7.0	1.3	7.9			51.7	46.6
1979	89.0	91,048	4.5	50.4		26.2	6.2	1.4	10.8			54.9	43.2
1982	90.0	92,758	4.6	52.0	1.6	22.6	3.9	1.5	13.6			56.6	40.1
1985	88.3	91,793	4.6	51.3	1.4	19.7	9.2		13.6			55.9	42.5
1988	84.2	86,513	5.5	50.0	5.0	18.2	8.7	1.9	10.5			60.5	37.4
1991	84.7	87,337	4.6	44.9	3.3	16.8	6.7	4.6	13.3		5.0	49.5	41.5
1994	85.6	88,488	6.8	51.3	5.8	15.0	4.5	2.4	13.0		0.5	63.9	34.8
1998	80.5	81,025	15.2	41.3	5.7	12.1	2.8	7.6	13.8			62.1	36.3
2002	77.8	76,865	11.0	44.6	5.2	15.2	7.2	5.0	9.9	0.3		60.7	37.4
2006	79.8	78,018	8.3	40.2	5.0	16.8	4.1	3.7	17.6	1.6		53.5	42.3
2010	83.1	81,936	6.5	40.3	6.5	12.8	3.9	2.9	22.2	3.8		53.3	41.7
2014	85.3	83,714	6.3	39.8	5.7	11.3	2.8	2.5	17.3	11.0		51.7	34.0
2018	87.1	85,223	8.4	33.6	3.6	15.4	2.9	4.8	14.3	15.6		61.0	37.6
2022	85.0	86,118	5.6	36.1	5.0	9.1	2.6	5.4	14.8	20.1		55.8	42.9

== Municipalities ==
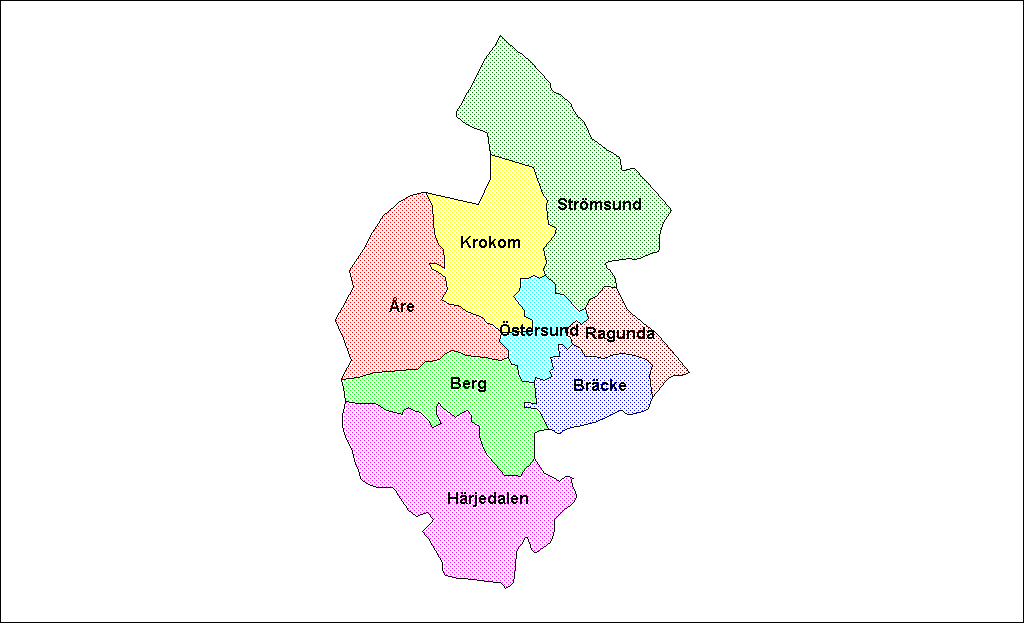
Location of Jämtland Municipalities

In Härjedalen Province:

- Härjedalen

In Jämtland Province:

- Berg
- Bräcke
- Krokom
- Ragunda
- Strömsund
- Åre
- Östersund

== Localities by population (2010) ==
Pos	Locality	Population
1	Östersund	44,327
2	Brunflo	3,890
3	Strömsund	3,589
4	Sveg	2,547
5	Krokom	2,277
6	Bräcke	1,651
7	Åre	1,417
8	Järpen	1,408
9	Ås	1,218
10	Hammarstrand	1,052
11	Lit	1,040
12	Svenstavik	1,004

== Demographics ==
=== Foreign background ===
SCB have collected statistics on backgrounds of residents since 2002. These tables consist of all who have two foreign-born parents or are born abroad themselves. The chart lists election years and the last year on record alone.

Location	2002	2006	2010	2014	2018	2019
Berg	2.4	3.7	5.6	7.9	10.3	10.1
Bräcke	5.1	7.1	9.1	11.4	14.2	13.9
Härjedalen	5.1	5.6	7.4	9.6	12.8	12.9
Krokom	4.3	5.1	5.9	7.2	8.7	8.8
Ragunda	4.8	5.5	7.3	10.8	13.7	13.5
Strömsund	4.0	5.6	8.4	11.2	13.5	13.8
Åre	5.7	6.2	7.4	9.9	14.8	14.7
Östersund	5.1	6.1	7.1	8.7	11.1	11.8
Total	4.8	5.8	7.2	9.1	11.7	12.0
Source: SCB

== Heraldry ==
The arms for the County of Jämtland is a combination of the arms of Heraldry of Jämtland and Heraldry of Härjedalen. When it is shown with a royal crown it represents the County Administrative Board. Blazon: "Parted per fess, the arms of Jämtland and the arms of Härjedalen."

== See also ==
- Duke of Jämtland, a title for members of the royal family (see Duchies in Sweden), born solely by Carl XVI Gustaf of Sweden before his accession to the throne.
- Jamtlandic
