= Funäsfjällen =

Ski area in Sweden

- Interactive map of Funäsfjällen
- Location: Funäsdalen, Jämtland, Sweden
- Nearest city: Sveg
- Coordinates: 62.54933°N 12.55159°E
- Vertical: 315 m (1,033 ft)
- Trails: 134 total
- Longest run: 2.1 km (1.3 mi)
- Lift system: 34
- Snowmaking: yes
- Night skiing: yes
- Website: funasfjallen.se

Funäsfjällen is an alpine ski area in Sweden.

Funäsfjällen consists of the resorts Funäsdalen, Ramundberget, Tänndalen, Bruksvallarna, Ljusnedal, Messlingen (Mittådalen), Tännäs and Fjällnäs.

== Alpine skiing ==
There are five resorts with alpine skiing: Funäsdalsberget, Ramundberget, Tänndalen (with Tänndalsvallen), Tännäskröket and Kappruet.

== Cross-country skiing ==
Nordic Ski Center, one of the largest cross-country skiing systems in the world (300 km groomed trails, 450 km marked trails), is situated in Funäsfjällen. In Bruksvallarna there are also groomed trails with snowmaking.
