= Swedish Cross-Country Skiing Championships =

Annual cross-country skiing event in Sweden

Swedish Cross-Country Skiing Championships Svenska mästerskapen i längdskidåkning
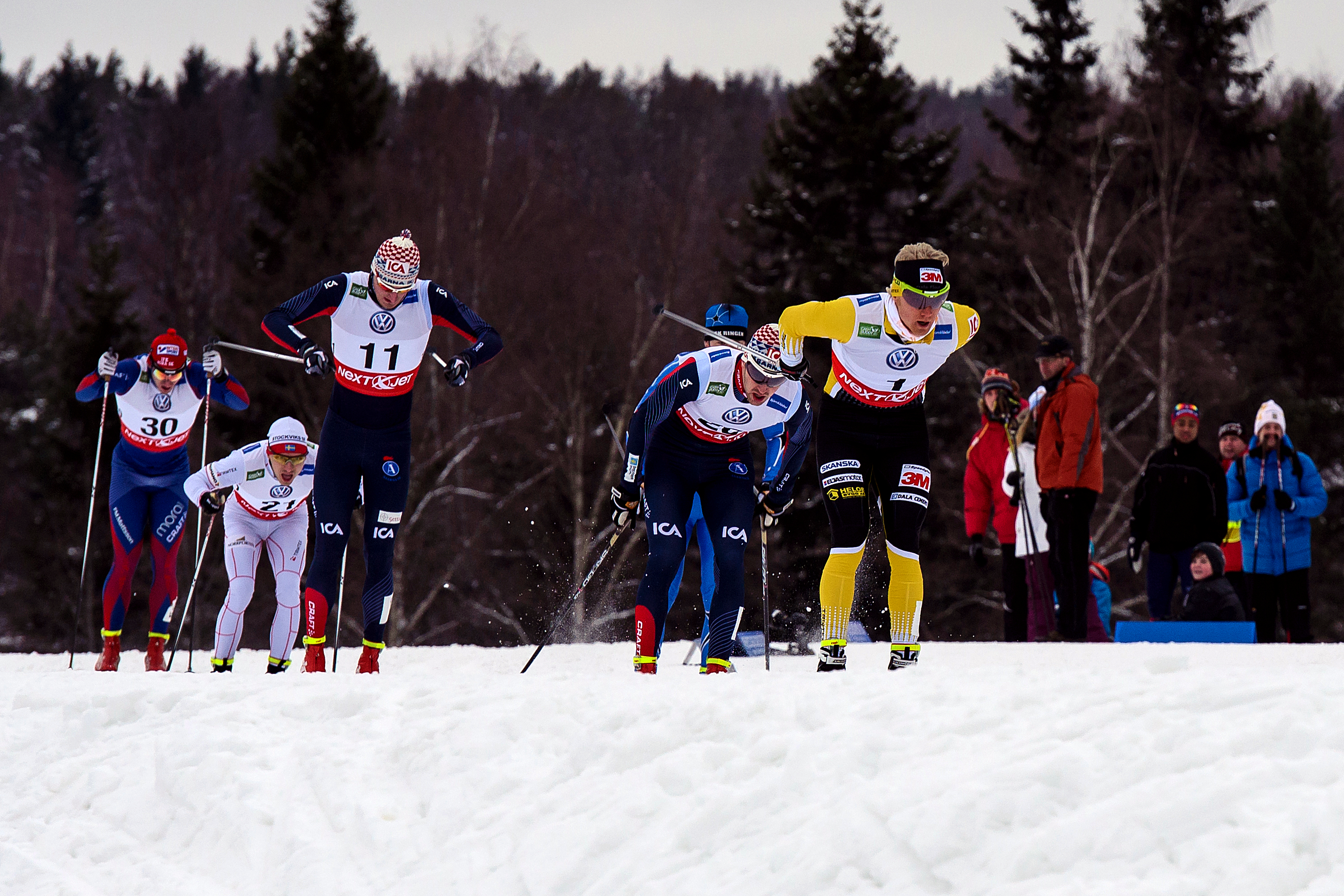
- 2013 men's sprint event
- Status: active
- Genre: sporting event
- Date: January–March
- Frequency: annual
- Location: different
- Country: Sweden
- Inaugurated: 1910 (men); 1917 (women)
- Organiser: Swedish Ski Association

The Swedish Cross-Country Skiing Championships (Swedish: Svenska mästerskapen i längdskidåkning) were first held in Härnösand in 1910. Only men's competitions were offered initially with the first women's competitions introduced subsequently in 1917.

== Places ==
=== Main events ===
- 1910: Härnösand
- 1911: Gävle
- 1912: Bollnäs
- 1913: Östersund
- 1914: Östersund
- 1915: Ludvika
- 1916: Örnsköldsvik
- 1917: Stockholm
- 1918: Sundsvall
- 1919: Saltsjöbaden
- 1920: Boden
- 1922: Stockholm
- 1923: Härnösand
- 1924: Filipstad
- 1925: Östersund
- 1926: Luleå
- 1927: Örnsköldsvik
- 1928: Sundsvall
- 1929: Hudiksvall
- 1930: Arvika
- 1931: Umeå
- 1932: Östersund
- 1933: Boden
- 1934: Lycksele
- 1935: Falun
- 1936: Luleå
- 1937: Örnsköldsvik
- 1938: Sollefteå
- 1939: Filipstad
- 1940: Sundsvall
- 1941: Umeå
- 1942: Hudiksvall
- 1943: Östersund
- 1944: Boden
- 1945: Kramfors
- 1946: Skellefteå
- 1947: Falun
- 1948: Kiruna
- 1949: Härnösand
- 1950: Örnsköldsvik
- 1951: Söderhamn
- 1952: Umeå
- 1953: Filipstad
- 1954: Lycksele
- 1955: Sundsvall
- 1956: Östersund
- 1957: Malung
- 1958: Kalix
- 1959: Skellefteå
- 1960: Hudiksvall
- 1961: Umeå
- 1962: Sollefteå
- 1963: Luleå
- 1964: Rättvik
- 1965: Lycksele
- 1966: Arvika
- 1967: Örnsköldsvik
- 1968: Kiruna
- 1969: Östersund
- 1970: Borlänge
- 1971: Skellefteå
- 1972: Sollefteå
- 1973: Lycksele
- 1974: Malmberget
- 1975: Umeå
- 1976: Umeå
- 1977: Sundsvall
- 1978: Piteå
- 1979: Mora
- 1980: Hudiksvall
- 1981: Filipstad
- 1982: Skövde
- 1983: Östersund
- 1984: Luleå
- 1985: Borlänge
- 1986: Örebro
- 1987: Örnsköldsvik
- 1988: Skellefteå
- 1989: Bollnäs
- 1990: Östersund (moved from Haninge)
- 1991: Timrå
- 1992: Kiruna
- 1993: Örnsköldsvik (moved from Borås)
- 1994: Sollefteå
- 1995: Sunne
- 1996: Umeå
- 1997: Åsarna
- 1998: Sundsvall/Skellefteå
- 1999: Piteå
- 2000: Östersund
- 2001: Filipstad/Umeå
- 2002: Gällivare
- 2003: Idre/Boden
- 2004: Skellefteå
- 2005: Hudiksvall/Luleå
- 2006: Boden/Luleå
- 2007: Åsarna (moved from Hudiksvall, Östersund, Bruksvallarna
- 2008: Falun/Borlänge/Orsa
- 2009: Sundsvall/Åsarna
- 2010: Piteå/Skellefteå
- 2011: Sundsvall (SM-veckan)/Piteå (relays)/Bruksvallarna (30/50 kilometres)
- 2012: Östersund (SM-veckan)/Långberget (relays and 30/50 kilometres)
- 2013: Falun (SM-veckan)/Boden (team sprint and 30/50 kilometres)
- 2014: Umeå (SM-veckan)/Åsarna (moved from Hudiksvall, team sprint and 30/50 kilometres)
- 2015: Örebro (SM-veckan)/Kalix (sprint relays and 30/50 kilometres)
- 2016: Piteå (SM-veckan)/Gällivare (sprint relays and 30/50 kilometres)
- 2017: Söderhamn (SM-veckan)/Umeå (sprint relays and 30/50 kilometres)
- 2018: Skellefteå (SM-veckan)/Bruksvallarna (sprint relays and supersprint)
- 2019: Sundsvall (SM-veckan)/Gällivare (30/50 kilometres)/Bruksvallarna (sprint relay)
- 2020: Cancelled because of the COVID-19 pandemic
- 2021: Borås/Kalix
- 2022: Piteå (SM-veckan)/Bruksvallarna (sprint relays)
- 2023: Skövde (SM-veckan)/Kalix (sprint relays and 30/50 kilometres)
- 2024: Boden (SM-veckan)
- 2025: Borås (SM-veckan) / Kalix (sprint relays and 30/50 kilometres)
- 2026: Umeå (SM-veckan) / Idre Fjäll (sprint relays and 30/50 kilometres)

=== Pursuit ===
- 1994: Hudiksvall
- 1995: Sundsvall
- 1996: Ulricehamn
- 1997: Nässjö
- 1998: Sundsvall
- 1999: Norberg
- 2000: Jönköping
- 2001: Filipstad
- 2002: Garphyttan
- 2003: Haninge
- 2004: Nässjö

=== Skiathlon ===
- 2005: Sundsvall

=== Sprint ===
- 2000: Åsarna
- 2001: Umeå
- 2002: Åsarna
- 2003: Boden
- 2004: Skellefteå
- 2005: Tynderö

=== Roller skiing ===
- 2010: Trollhättan
- 2011: Hudiksvall
- 2012: Lidköping
- 2013: Halmstad (SM-veckan), Falköping (mass start and hill)
