= Jämtlands Flyg =

Swedish helicopter operator

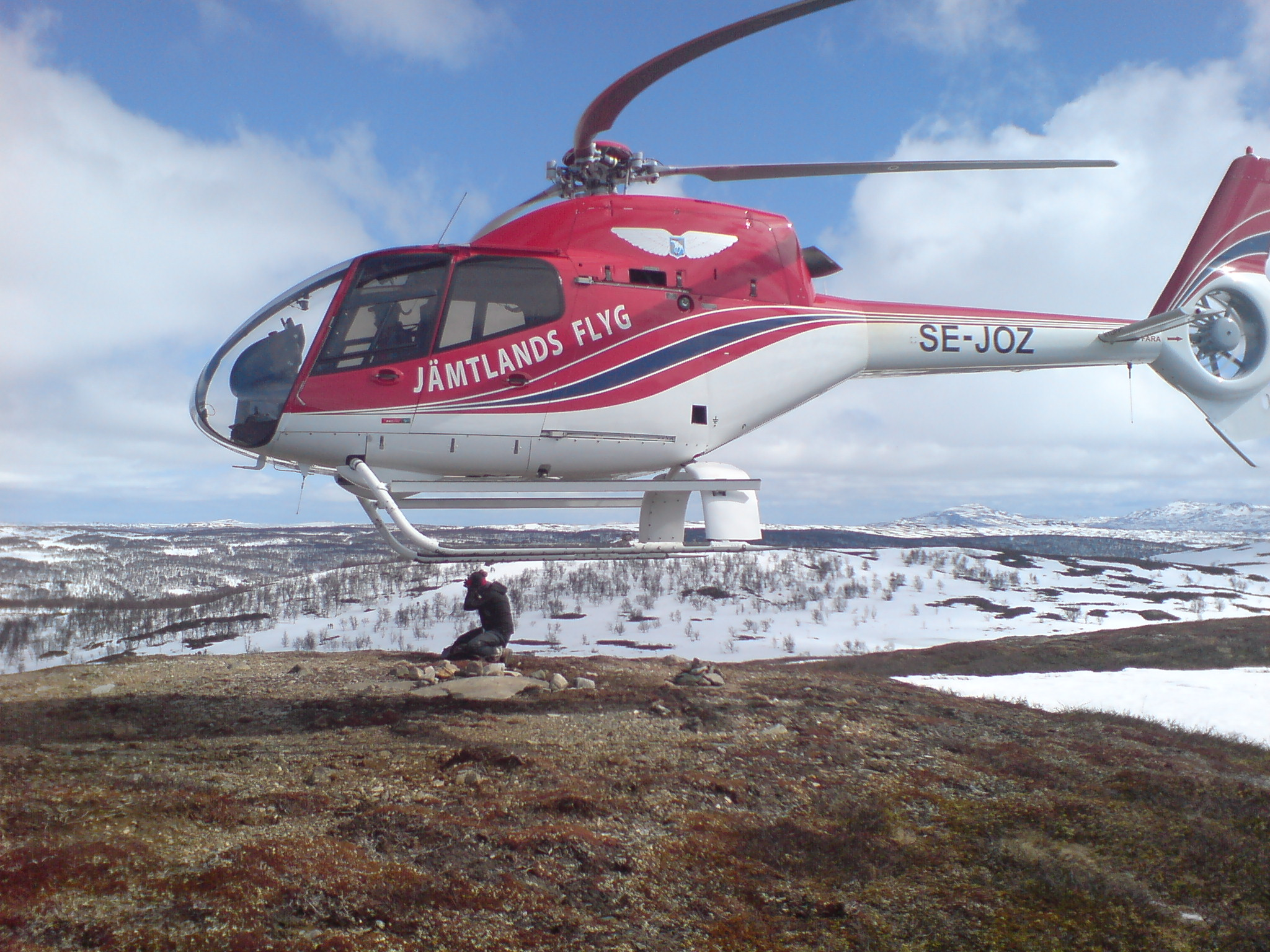
| IATA | ICAO | Call sign |
|---|---|---|
| - | - | - |
- Founded: 1954
- Ceased operations: 2019
- Hubs: Göviken/Östersund
- Secondary hubs: Ljusnedal/Funäsdalen; Laisholm/Tärnaby
- Focus cities: Östersund
- Fleet size: 7
- Headquarters: Östersund, Jämtland, Sweden
- Key people: Sara Grinde (CEO); Jon M Håkansson (COO); Ulf Grinde (Chief Pilot)
- Website: www.Jamtlandsflyg.se

Jämtlands Flyg AB was a Swedish helicopter company that specialised in aerial and charter work. It operated out of the main heliport Göviken in the city of Östersund, in Jämtland County. Jämtlands Flyg AB was a member of the Swedish Association of Aviation Companies (SFR) and a purveyor to the Court of Sweden.

== History ==
The company was founded in 1954 by the mountain-aviator Gunnar Andersson. At first, operations were solely by seaplanes. The company also ran cabins in the mountains for mainly fishing tourists and grouse hunters. Later these were sold off and rotor-wing aircraft took over entirely.

Andersson died in a plane crash in 1974. Later his daughter Siw A. Grinde took over as CEO in 1981 and ran the company until his granddaughter Sara Grinde took over as CEO in 2007. The company ceased all operations in 2019.

== Operations ==
- Fire-fighting/water bombing
- Herding of reindeer
- Inspection of power lines and forest
- Taxi/V.I.P.
- Game darting
- Game inventory
- Heavy lifting
- Precision lifting
- Snow radar measuring
- Supervision for Swedish government and law enforcement agencies
- Water sampling
- Photography and filming
- Parachuting

== Fleet ==
Jämtlands Flyg AB operated seven helicopters.

| Helicopter | No of aircraft | Seats | Sling load |
|---|---|---|---|
| Eurocopter AS350B2 Ecureuil | 1 | 6-7 | 1160 kg |
| Eurocopter EC 120B Colibri | 3 | 5 | 550 kg |
| Robinson R44 Raven II | 3 | 4 | 300 kg |

== Bases ==
Bases with heli-ports and hangars were in use at the following locations:

| Heliport/base | Location | Details | Coordinates |
|---|---|---|---|
| Göviken | Östersund, Jämtland | Main office, hangars and service | 63°11′33″N 14°37′53″E |
| Ljusnedal | Funäsdalen, Härjedalen | Hangars | 62°31′24″N 12°35′27″E |
| Laisholm | Tärnaby, Västerbotten | Hangars | 65°45′21″N 15°9′36″E |

== See also ==
- Airlines
- Transport in Sweden
