= Fettjeåfallet =

Waterfall in Sweden

Coordinates: 62°32′17″N 14°8′35″E

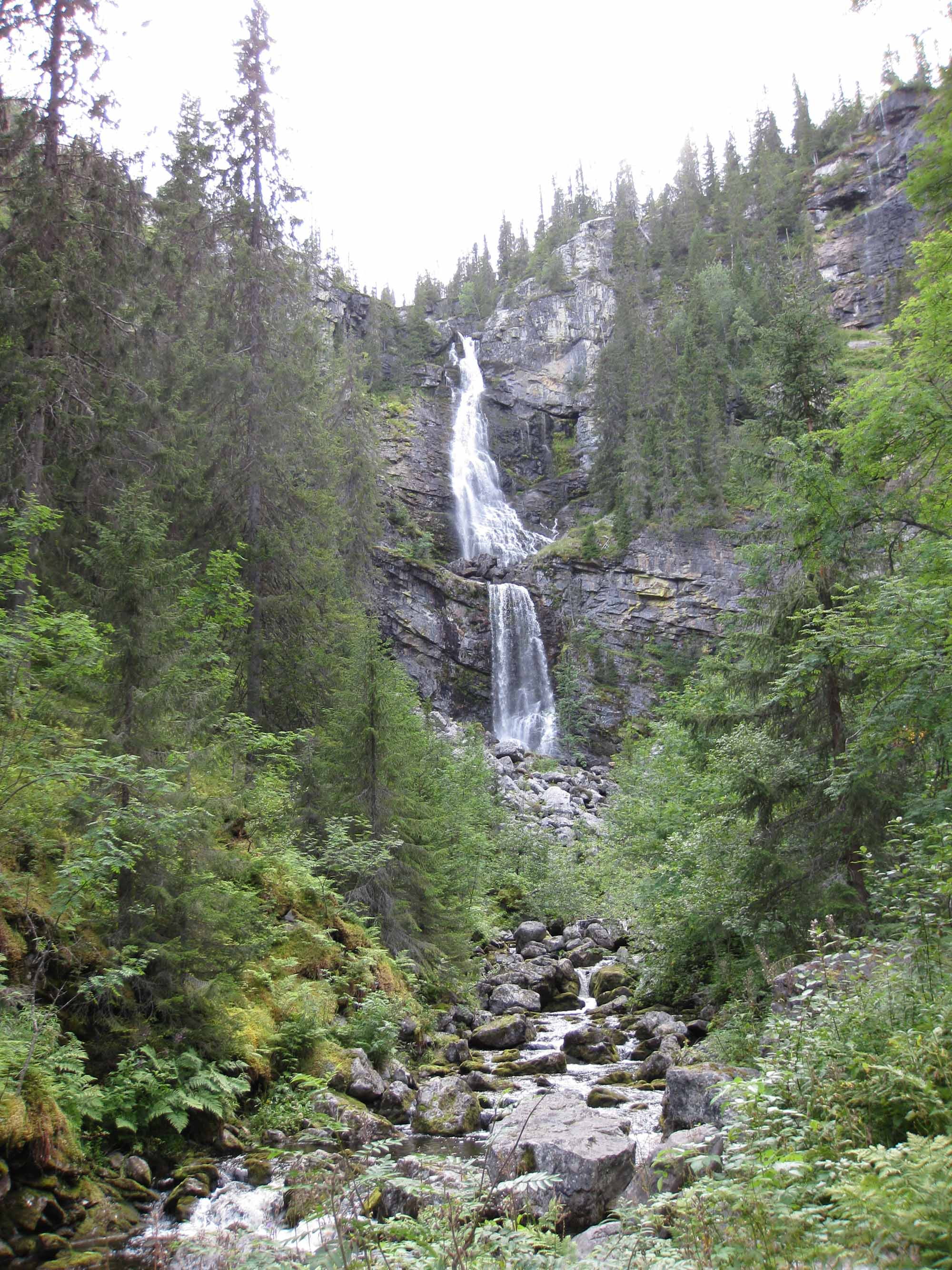
Fettjeåfallet

Fettjeåfallet is a waterfall located just west of Klövsjö in Fettjeån (Fättjeån), Jämtland, Sweden. It has a height of about 60 metres (200 ft). It is a popular destination of hikers in the summer and for ice climbing in the winter.

== See also ==
- List of waterfalls
