= Svenstavik =

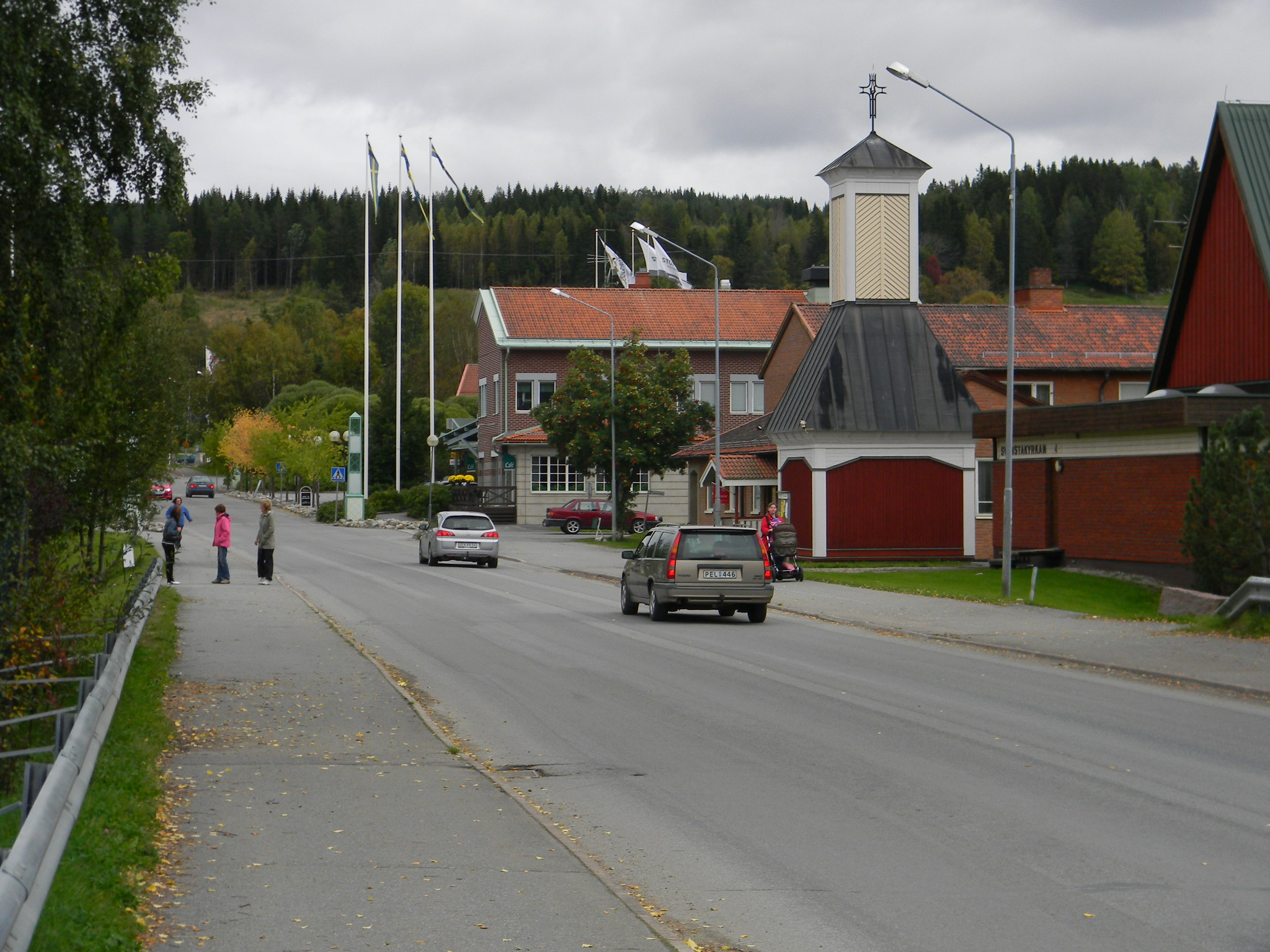
- Svenstavik in September 2011

- Location within Jämtland Location within Sweden
- Coordinates: 62°46′N 14°27′E
- Country: Sweden
- Province: Jämtland
- County: Jämtland County
- Municipality: Berg Municipality

Area
  - Total: 1.51 km^{2} (0.58 sq mi)

Population (31 December 2010)
  - Total: 1,004
  - Density: 666/km^{2} (1,720/sq mi)
- Time zone: UTC+1 (CET)
  - Summer (DST): UTC+2 (CEST)

Svenstavik is a locality and the seat of Berg Municipality in Jämtland County, Sweden with 1,004 inhabitants in 2010.

== Route ==
European route E45 passes through Svenstavik, and County Road 321 (länsväg 321) begins here and ends at Mattmar in Åre. Inland Line (Swedish: Inlandsbanan) rail line arrived in the area during the 1910s. The Svenstavik–Brunflo line opened during 1917 and Svenstavik–Åsarna line in 1918.

== Popularity ==
Svenstavik is most famous for Älghälga, a festival to celebrate the start of moose hunting.
