= The Ghost Pilot =

The Ghost Pilot may refer to:

- "The Ghost Pilot", an episode of SWAT Kats: The Radical Squadron
- Gunnar "the Ghost Pilot" Andersson (1923–1974), Swedish aviator
