= Galåbodarna =

Coordinates: 62.838°N 13.819°E

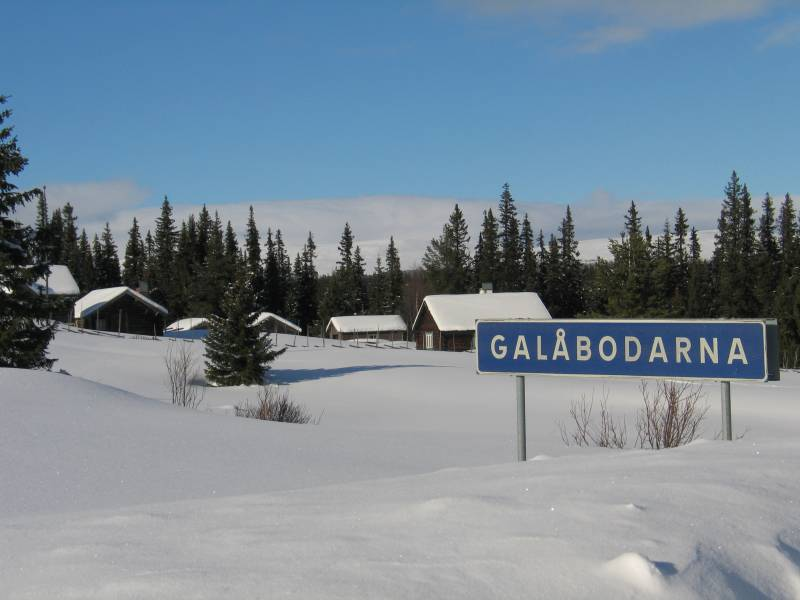
Galåbodarna in wintertime

Galåbodarna is a mountain pasture settlement near Galån creek in the southern part of Oviksfjällen in Jämtland, Sweden. The pastures belong to farmers in Oviken and Myssjö and are located next to the road between Börtnan and Arådalen. The road also goes to Arådalen and Glen. The pastures were probably established in the 1700s and was used for cattle-raising through the mid-1970s. The surrounding area is mainly spruce and bogs. In 2004, log cabins were built for tourists. Since the 1960s and 1970s, there were already several houses and cabins built near the old pasture.
