= Rätan =

- Location within Jämtland Location within Sweden
- Coordinates: 62°28′N 14°32′E
- Country: Sweden
- Province: Jämtland
- County: Jämtland County
- Municipality: Berg Municipality

Area
  - Total: 0.34 km^{2} (0.13 sq mi)

Population (2005-12-31)
  - Total: 168
- Time zone: UTC+1 (CET)
  - Summer (DST): UTC+2 (CEST)

Rätan is a locality situated in Berg Municipality, Jämtland County, Sweden with 168 inhabitants in 2005.
