= Hoverberget =

Nature reserve in Jämtland, Sweden

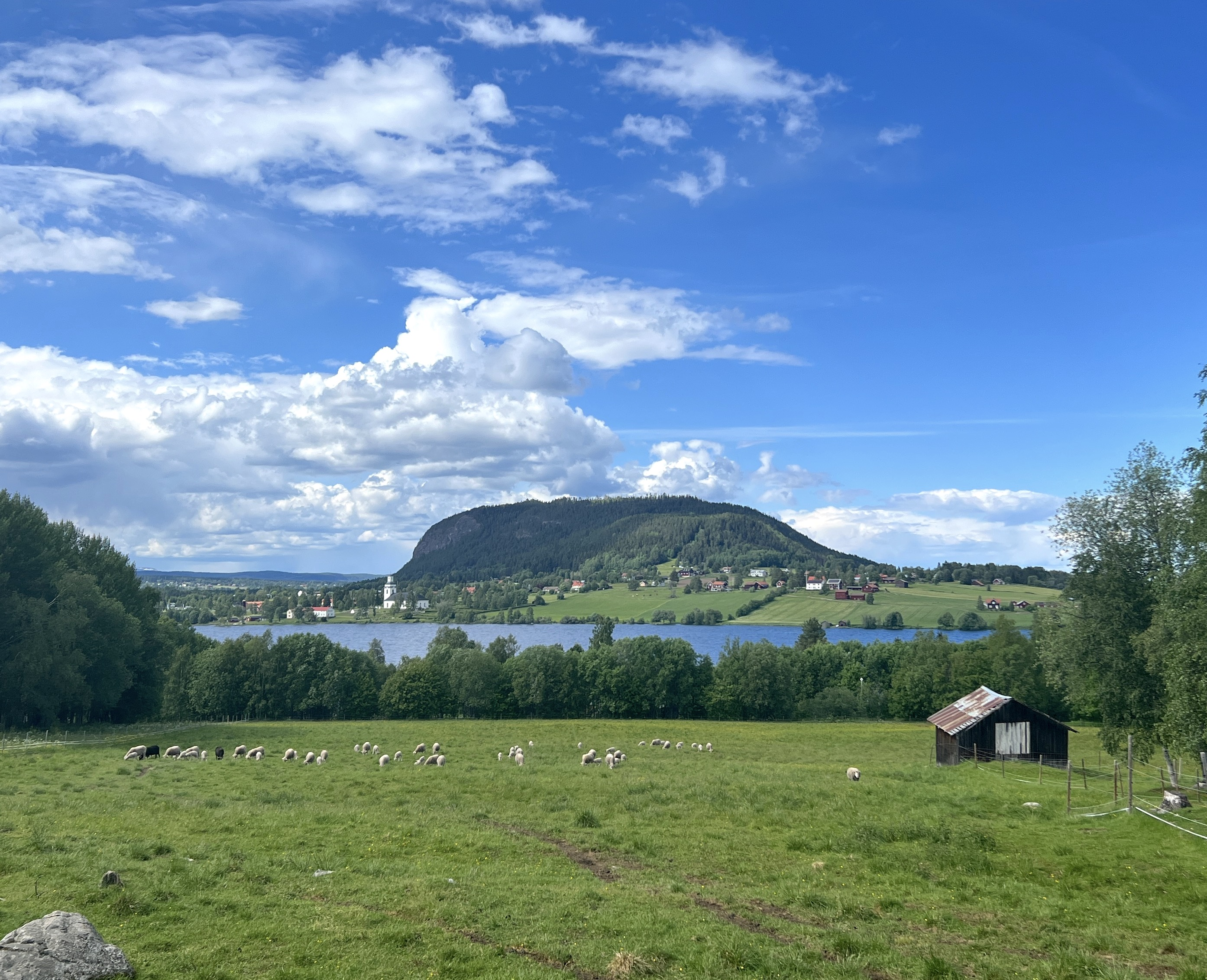
- View of Hoverberget seen from Skanderåsen

Highest point
- Elevation: 548 m (1,798 ft)
- Coordinates: 62°49′50.80″N 14°25′42.51″E

Naming
- English translation: Hover Mountain

Geography
- Location: Sweden

Hoverberget is a mountain on a peninsula in the southern part of the Storsjön lake. The mountain, a significant landmark and a Natura 2000 designated nature reserve, lies within Berg Municipality in the southern parts of Jämtland in northern Sweden. The village of Berg lies on the south slope of the Hoverberget, which is 255 m (837 ft) above the Storsjön and the surrounding area, and culminates at 548 m (1,798 ft) above sea level.

Hoverberget is made of porphyry, and originates from the same period as the Scandinavian Mountains. For millions of years it has been moving eastwards, and it now lies isolated and apart from other mountains. The mountain is rich in flora, with several orchid species, and many of the plants grow at their northernmost growth boundary. There are several rare species of moss and lichen. The mountain also has a rich bird life, with many birds of prey such as the common kestrel, the Eurasian sparrowhawk and the long-eared owl. Besides more common mammals, Hoverberget is also home to Eurasian lynx.

The tourist attraction called the Hoverberg Cave (Hoverbergsgrottan) is 170 m (560 ft) deep, and is the largest rock cave in Scandinavia. It was discovered 1897 by Jöns Väst, a Swedish-American. 81 m (266 ft) of the cave is accessible to visitors. Less known is the Fissure (Rämnan), a large ravine in the mountain with a length of about 400 m (1,300 ft) and a depth of about 25 m (82 ft), that is visible from the west and even from the county highway (länsväg) 321. According to a folk tale, a giant called the Old Man of Hoverberg Lad (Hoverbergsgubben) resided in the cave, but he moved out when people began to tidy the cave.

At the top of Hoverberget is a small café, which is open in the summer season. Adjacent to it is an observation tower, for those who want to look for the lake monster Storsjöodjuret, a folkloric phenomenon in the lake, or to enjoy the view.

== Images ==
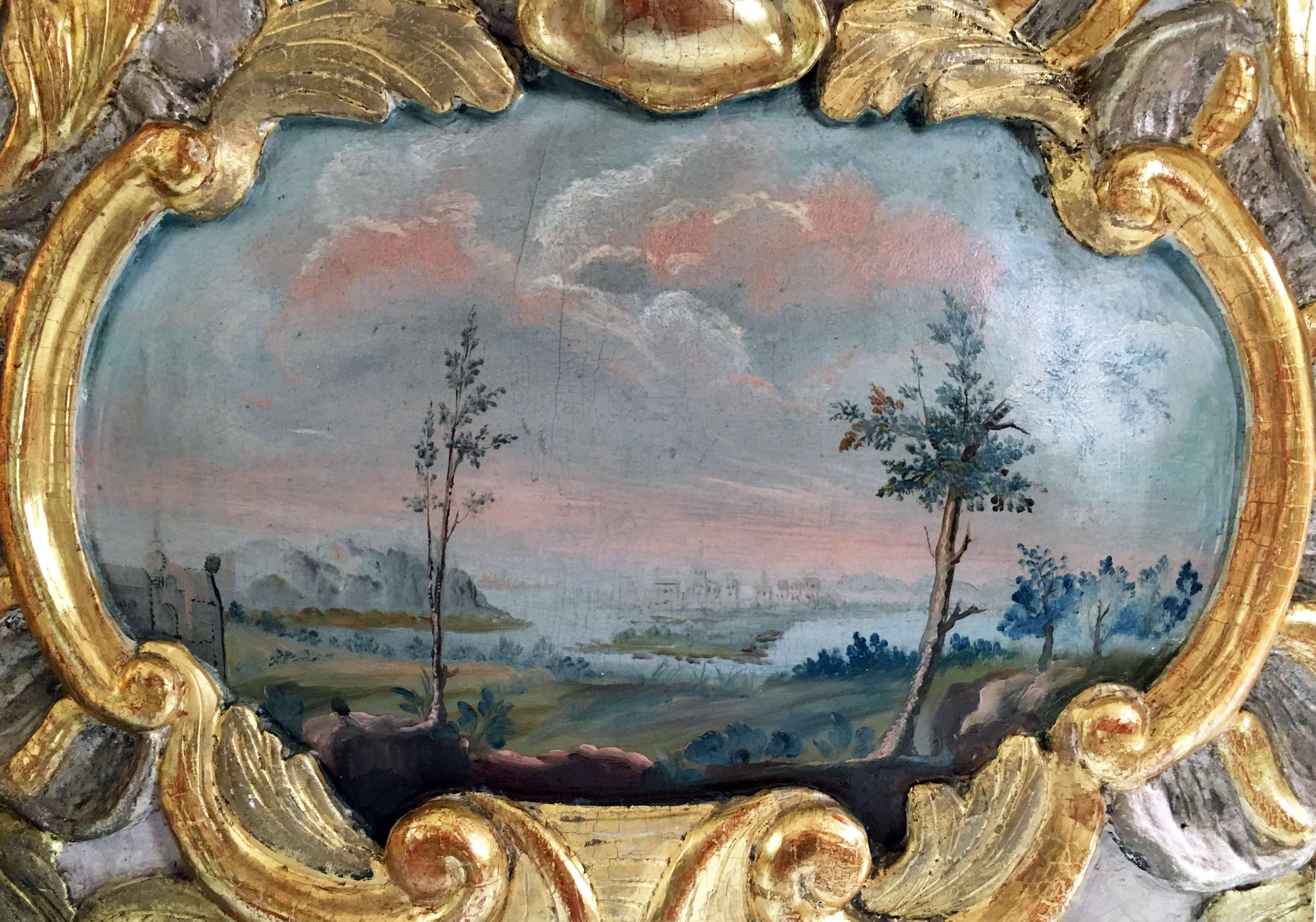
Detail from the altar in Hackås Church with a painting by local artist Anders Berglin (1737–1805), depicting the view from Hackås across Lake Storsjön, with Hoverberget visible on the left.

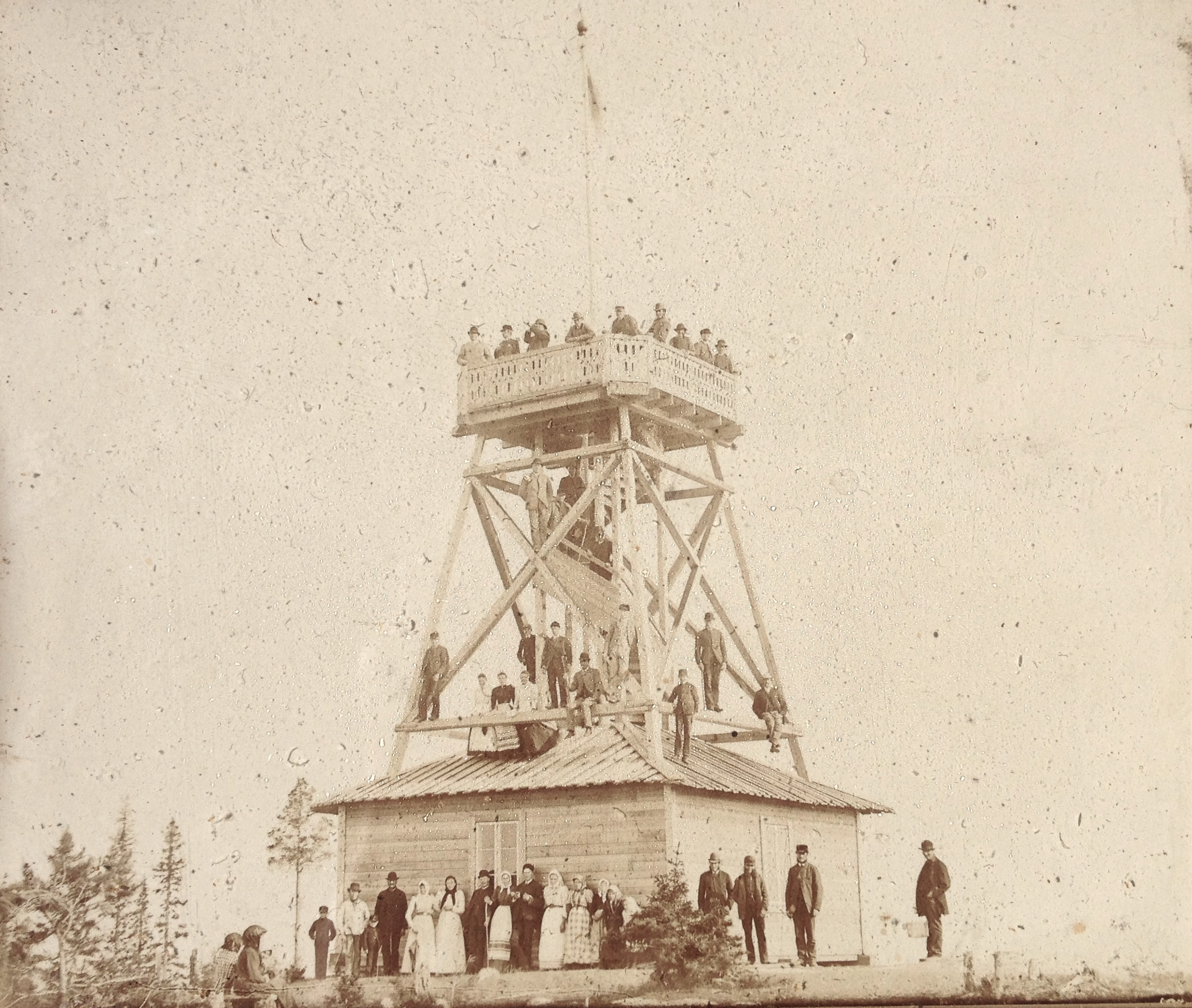
The old observation tower on Hoverberget around the turn of the twentieth century (c. 1900). Photo by Johannes Leander (1866-1936).

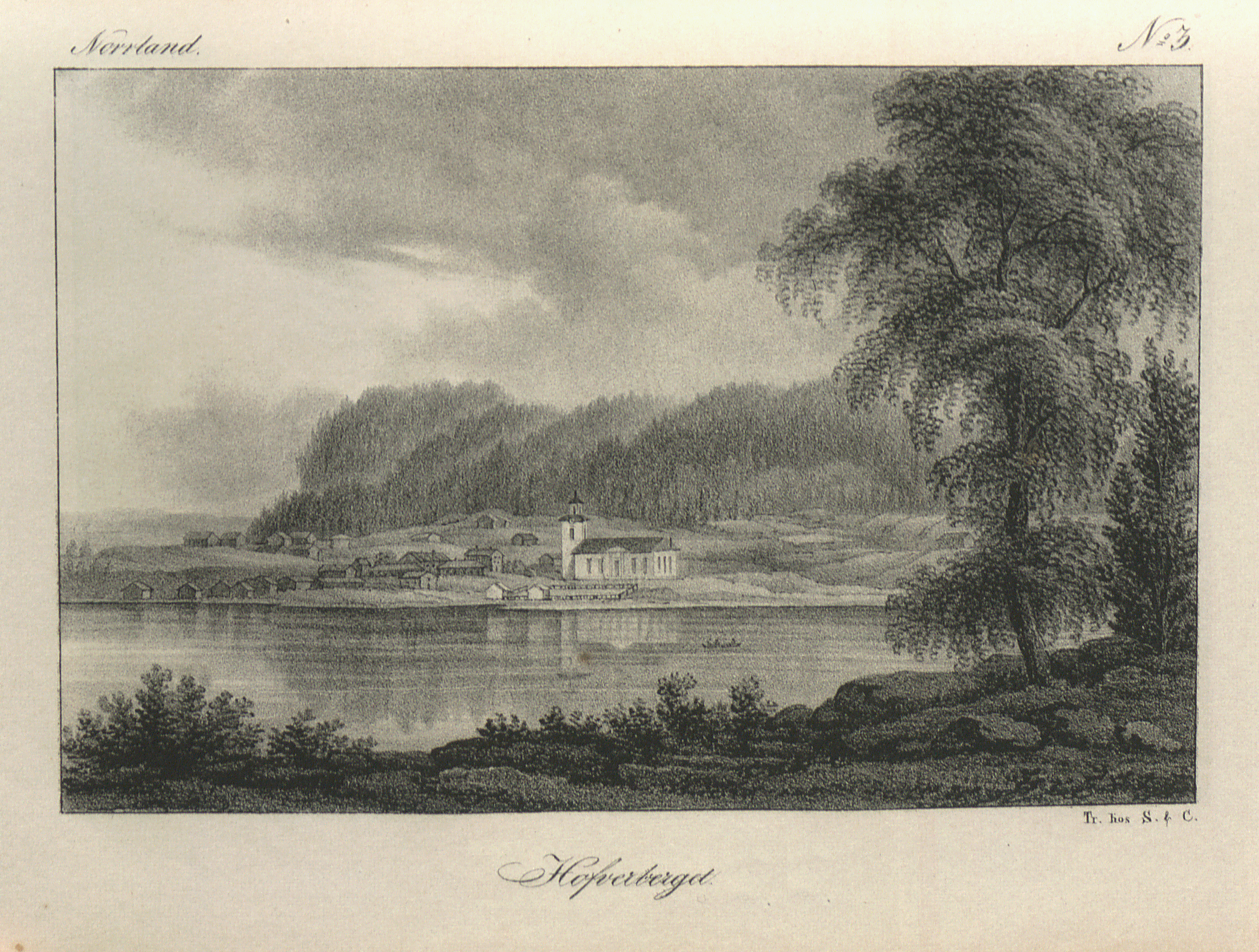
Hoverberget as depicted in the book Sweden Illustrated in Drawings (Sverige framstäldt i teckningar) by Gustaf Henrik Mellin, Stockholm, 1837–1840.

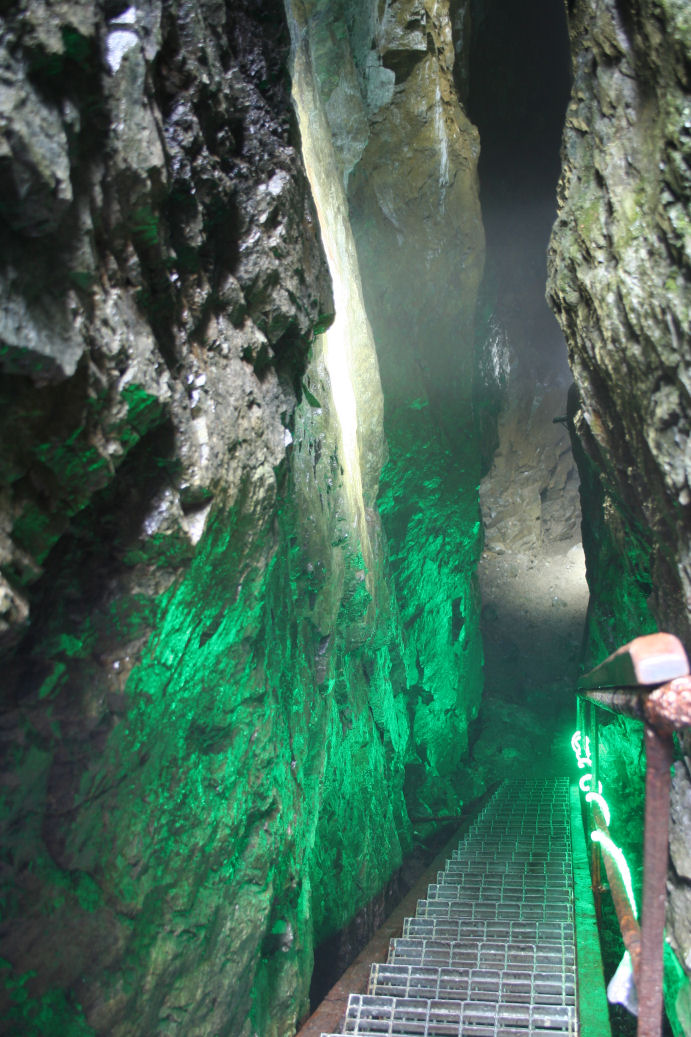
Entrance to the Hoverberg Cave

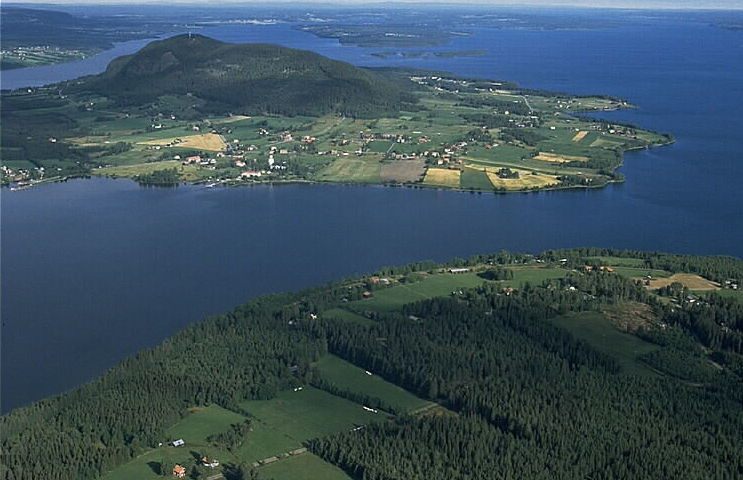
Aeral photo, 1996.
