= Funäsdalen =

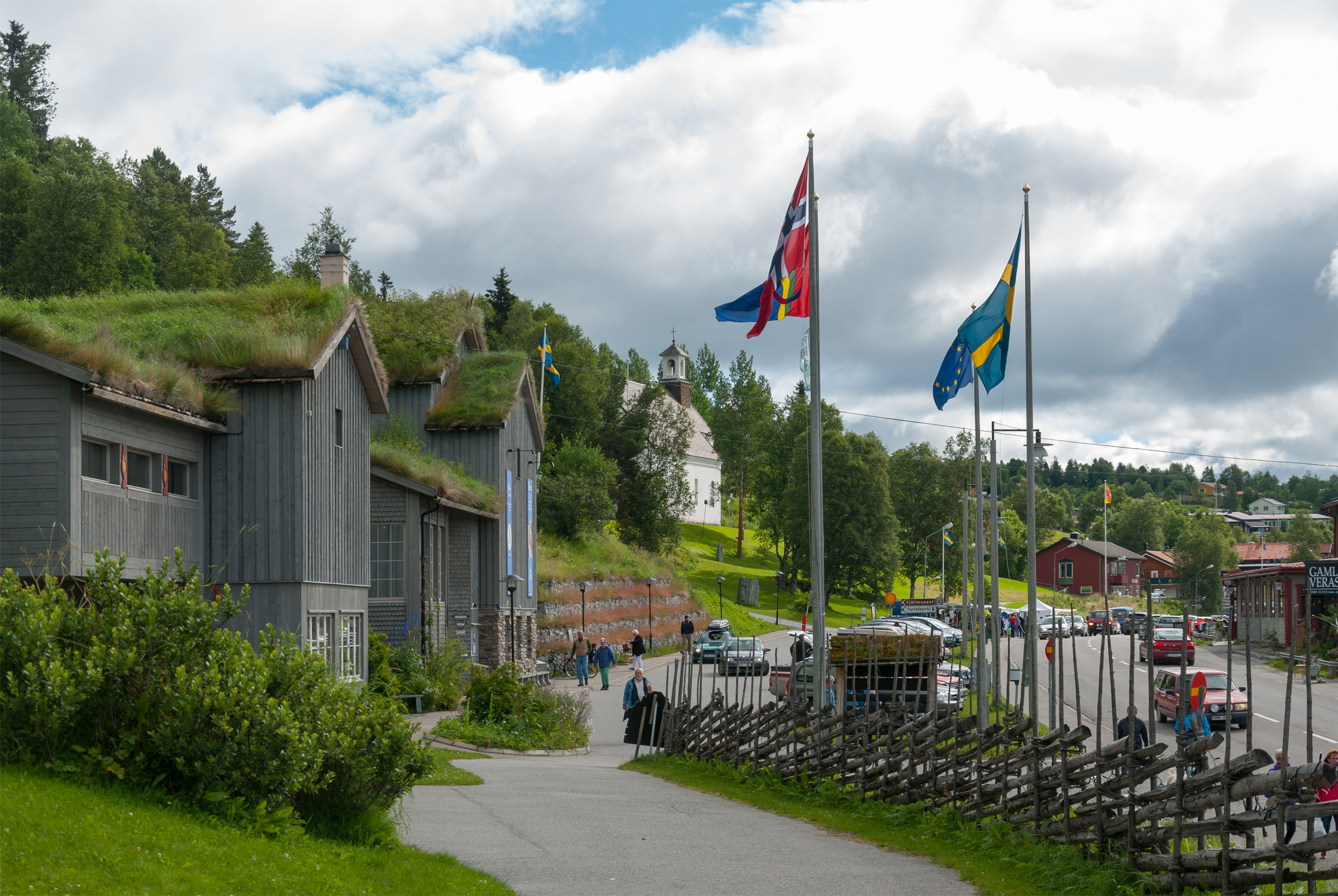
- Funäsdalen in August 2012

- Location within Jämtland Location within Sweden
- Coordinates: 62°32′N 12°33′E
- Country: Sweden
- Province: Härjedalen
- County: Jämtland County
- Municipality: Härjedalen Municipality

Area
  - Total: 1.75 km^{2} (0.68 sq mi)

Population (31 December 2010)
  - Total: 890
  - Density: 507/km^{2} (1,310/sq mi)
- Time zone: UTC+1 (CET)
  - Summer (DST): UTC+2 (CEST)

Funäsdalen is a village located in Härjedalen Municipality, Jämtland County, Sweden with 890 inhabitants in 2010. Funäsdalen is situated in western Härjedalen near the Norwegian border.

Funäsdalen is the site of Härjedalens Fjällmuseum which provides exhibits relating to mountain farming and Sami culture. Funäsdalen has long been a gathering place for Sámi people. The museum buildings were designed by architect Jörgen Grönvik. Inside the museum there is a permanent exhibition of work by sculptor Emil Näsvall (1908-1965). Adjacent to the museum is Fornminnesparken. This open-air museum provides a display of historic buildings dating from the 16th century to the 19th century.

Funäsdalen Church (Funäsdalens kyrka) was built between 1926 and 1928 after drawings by the architects Curt Björklund (1895-1958) and Martin Westerberg (1892-1963). The building has a frame of brick. The altarpiece is attributed to the 17th century Dutch artist Henricus Noêll. The church is in the parish of Tännäs-Ljusnedal of the Diocese of Härnösand.

== Climate ==
Funäsdalen has a subarctic climate influenced by the combination of its high elevation and simultaneous deep valley position. This leads to high diurnal temperature variation and cooler summer days than its far inland position would suggest. Being a ski resort, Funäsdalen has lower accumulation than Storlien to its north, but retains a reliable snow pack due to the consistently cold temperatures. With the inversion at the lower elevations in the valley combined with longer nights in summer, frosts are common year round. The regular seasonal variation is slightly larger than Røros on the Norwegian side of the border, although the all-time temperature range is larger in the Norwegian town.

Climate data for Ljusnedal 2002–2021 (extremes since 1917)
Month	Jan	Feb	Mar	Apr	May	Jun	Jul	Aug	Sep	Oct	Nov	Dec	Year
Record high °C (°F)	9.5 (49.1)	9.9 (49.8)	14.5 (58.1)	18.6 (65.5)	27.3 (81.1)	31.0 (87.8)	30.1 (86.2)	28.7 (83.7)	25.7 (78.3)	21.0 (69.8)	11.6 (52.9)	8.2 (46.8)	31.0 (87.8)
Mean maximum °C (°F)	3.5 (38.3)	5.0 (41.0)	8.3 (46.9)	13.1 (55.6)	21.7 (71.1)	24.4 (75.9)	25.9 (78.6)	23.9 (75.0)	19.8 (67.6)	13.3 (55.9)	6.9 (44.4)	4.8 (40.6)	27.0 (80.6)
Mean daily maximum °C (°F)	−5.1 (22.8)	−2.6 (27.3)	1.4 (34.5)	6.2 (43.2)	11.8 (53.2)	16.6 (61.9)	19.2 (66.6)	17.4 (63.3)	12.6 (54.7)	5.7 (42.3)	−0.4 (31.3)	−3.7 (25.3)	6.6 (43.9)
Daily mean °C (°F)	−10.4 (13.3)	−8.4 (16.9)	−4.9 (23.2)	0.5 (32.9)	5.7 (42.3)	10.3 (50.5)	13.0 (55.4)	11.3 (52.3)	7.4 (45.3)	1.4 (34.5)	−4.6 (23.7)	−8.6 (16.5)	1.1 (33.9)
Mean daily minimum °C (°F)	−15.7 (3.7)	−14.2 (6.4)	−11.2 (11.8)	−5.2 (22.6)	−0.4 (31.3)	4.0 (39.2)	6.7 (44.1)	5.2 (41.4)	2.1 (35.8)	−2.9 (26.8)	−8.8 (16.2)	−13.4 (7.9)	−4.5 (23.9)
Mean minimum °C (°F)	−31.4 (−24.5)	−30.7 (−23.3)	−27.3 (−17.1)	−16.6 (2.1)	−7.2 (19.0)	−3.0 (26.6)	−0.7 (30.7)	−2.5 (27.5)	−5.6 (21.9)	−14.0 (6.8)	−21.9 (−7.4)	−28.0 (−18.4)	−34.1 (−29.4)
Record low °C (°F)	−47.0 (−52.6)	−44.0 (−47.2)	−39.6 (−39.3)	−30.8 (−23.4)	−17.5 (0.5)	−8.3 (17.1)	−4.0 (24.8)	−7.3 (18.9)	−14.0 (6.8)	−27.2 (−17.0)	−37.0 (−34.6)	−45.0 (−49.0)	−47.0 (−52.6)
Average precipitation mm (inches)	39.5 (1.56)	26.4 (1.04)	25.0 (0.98)	22.6 (0.89)	48.1 (1.89)	65.5 (2.58)	87.7 (3.45)	76.3 (3.00)	53.1 (2.09)	46.8 (1.84)	41.9 (1.65)	35.0 (1.38)	567.9 (22.35)
Average extreme snow depth cm (inches)	46 (18)	54 (21)	57 (22)	42 (17)	4 (1.6)	0 (0)	0 (0)	0 (0)	0 (0)	7 (2.8)	19 (7.5)	29 (11)	59 (23)
Source 1: SMHI Open Data for Ljusnedal, temperature
Source 2: SMHI Open Data for Ljusnedal, precipitation

== Recreation ==
=== Skiing ===
- Funäsfjällen alpine ski area

== Gallery ==
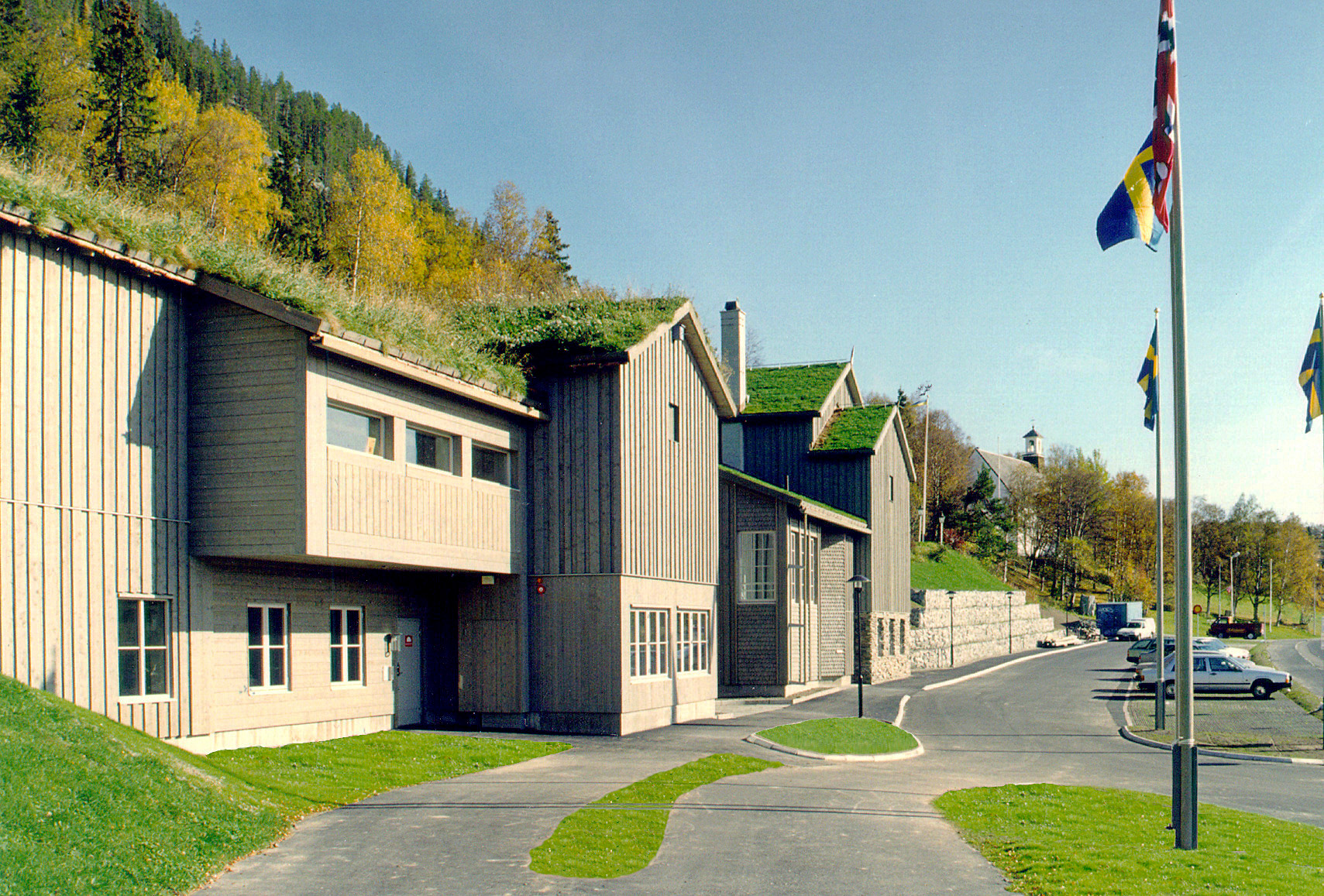
Härjedalens Fjällmuseum

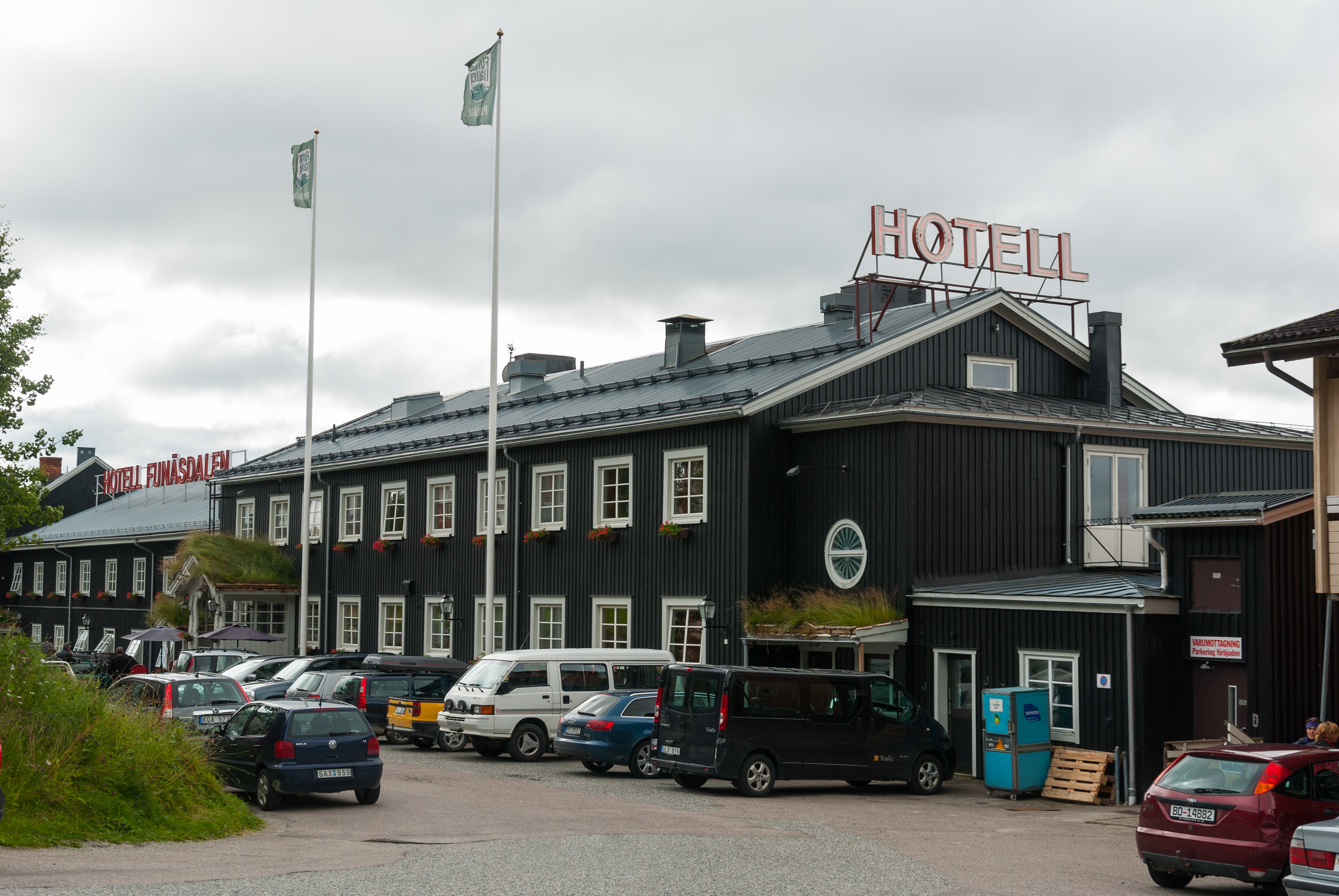
Hotell Funäsdalen in August 2012

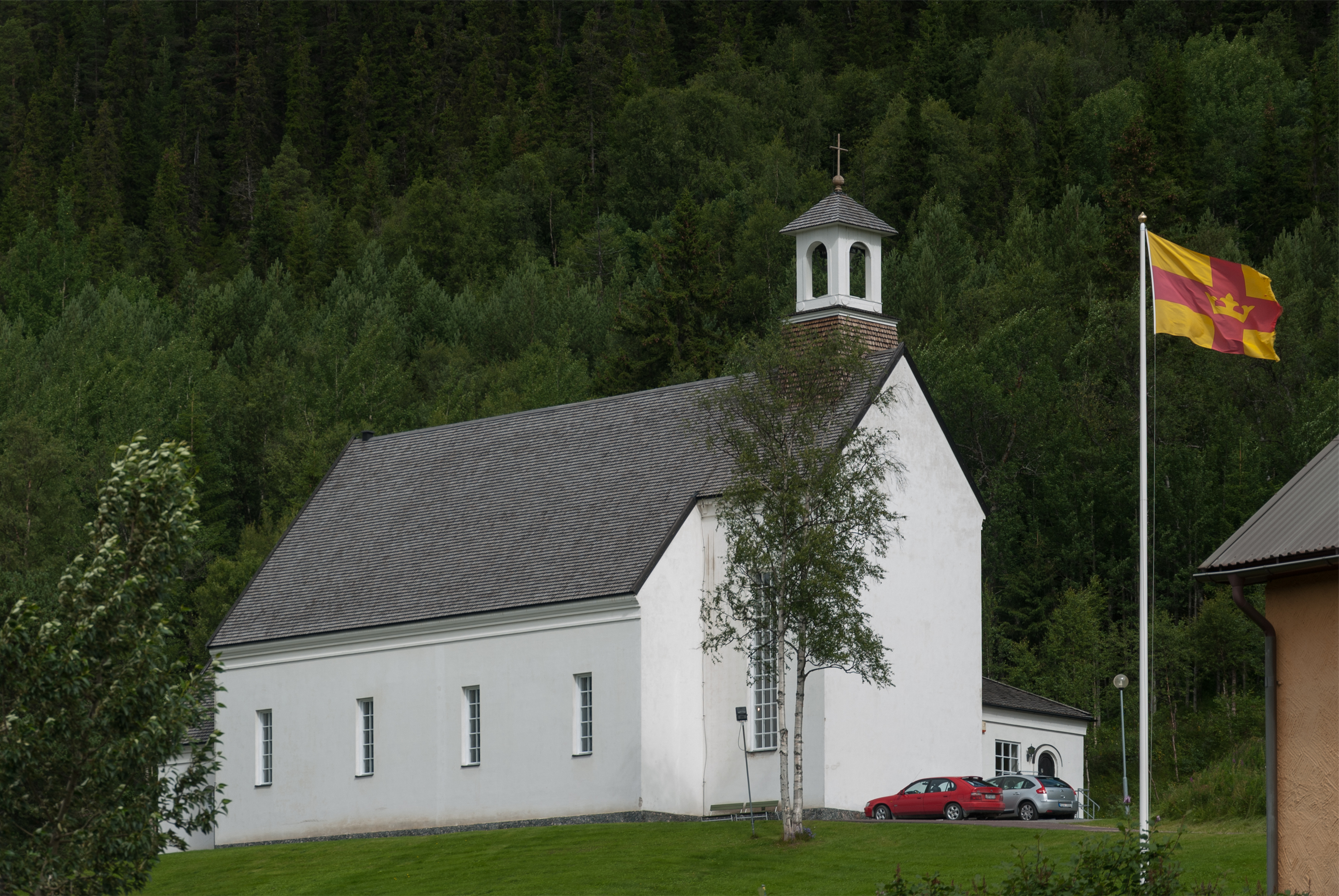
Funäsdalen Church in August 2012
