= Myrviken =

- Location within Jämtland Location within Sweden
- Coordinates: 63°00′N 14°21′E
- Country: Sweden
- Province: Jämtland
- County: Jämtland County
- Municipality: Berg Municipality

Area
  - Total: 0.34 km^{2} (0.13 sq mi)

Population (31 December 2010)
  - Total: 239
  - Density: 705/km^{2} (1,830/sq mi)
- Time zone: UTC+1 (CET)
  - Summer (DST): UTC+2 (CEST)

Myrviken is a locality situated in Berg Municipality, Jämtland County, Sweden with 239 inhabitants in 2010.
