= Gunnar Andersson (aviator) =

Swedish aviator (1923–1974)

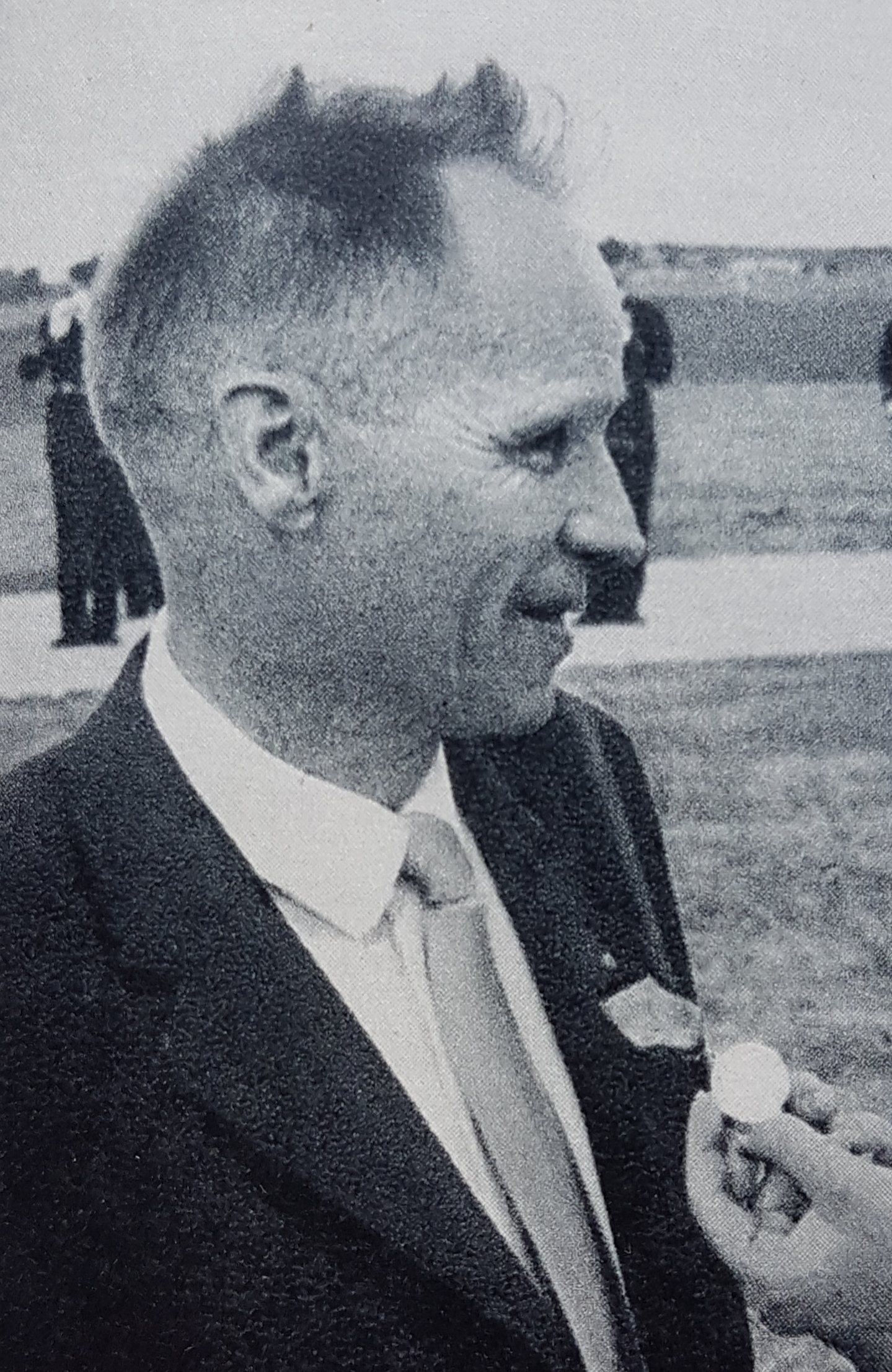
- Photograph of Andersson from the magazine Flygrevyn. Unknown date.
- Born: Stig Gunnar Andersson; August 1, 1924; Östersund, Sweden
- Died: December 19, 1974 (aged 50); Medelpad, Sweden
- Burial place: Norra Begravningsplatsen, Östersund, Sweden
- Occupation: Aviator
- Known for: Mountain aviation and founding of Jämtlands Flyg

Stig Gunnar "Spökis" ("Ghosty") Andersson (1 August 1923 – 19 December 1974) was a Swedish aviator and entrepreneur. He is considered a pioneer of Scandinavian mountain aviation and was the founder of the airline Jämtlands Flyg.

== Early life ==
Andersson was born and raised in Östersund, where he developed an early interest in aviation. He started out as a radio-seller in remote areas, but in 1954, he founded Jämtlands Flyg, an airline based at Göviken in Östersund. The company specialized in mountain flights, serving the remote areas of the Swedish wilderness that were inaccessible by road.

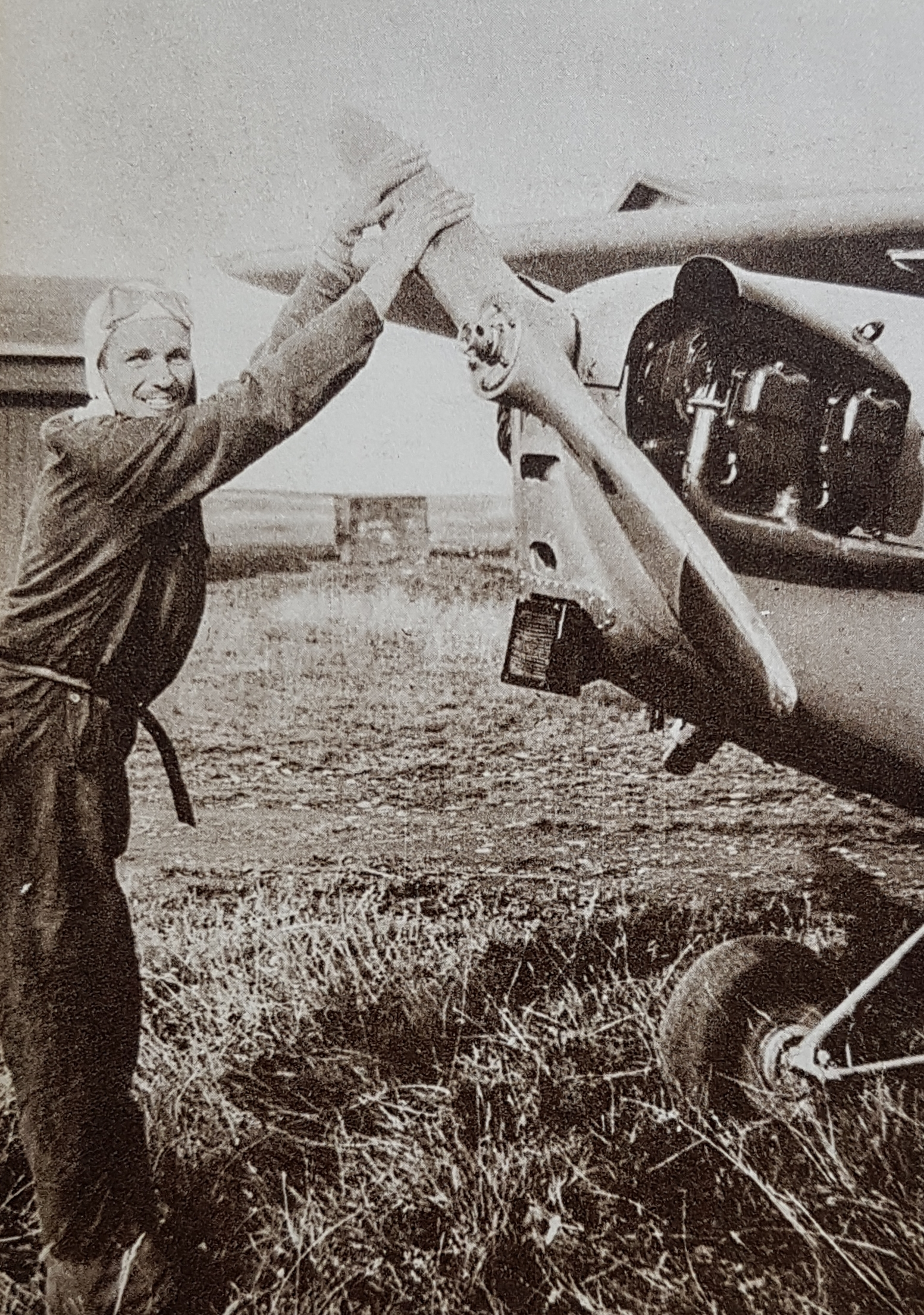
Andersson with his Republic RC-3 Seabee in a photograph from the magazine Flygrevyn. Unknown date.

== Career ==
Throughout his career, Andersson primarily operated the Republic RC-3 Seabee, an American amphibious aircraft, with his plane being registered with the tail number SE-AXR. His work was diverse, the company transported tourists and hikers, conducted essential services such as ambulance flights and cargo transport to mountain stations, and supported reindeer husbandry for the local Sámi communities. The nickname "Spökis" (a diminutive of the Swedish word spöke, meaning "ghost") was attributed to Andersson's ability to fly in unfavourable weather conditions. He was known for navigating through heavy fog and snowstorms. Andersson was frequently called upon by the police and mountain rescue services to assist in search and rescue operations. His expertise was vital in saving numerous lives in the Swedish mountains during the 1950s, 60s, and early 70s.

== Death and legacy ==
Andersson died in a helicopter crash on 19 December 1974 in Medelpad, Sweden, at the age of 51. He is buried at Norra begravningsplatsen in Östersund.

His life and career were chronicled in the biography Spökis: fjällflygare (Spökis: Mountain Pilot), written by Thure H. Sjöberg and published in 1980.

In November 2013, Andersson's aircraft, the Seabee SE-AXR, was returned to Östersund after being located in the United States for several decades. The aircraft was acquired by local enthusiasts and the Jämtlands Flyg- och Lottamuseum to be preserved as a historical monument to Andersson’s contributions to Swedish aviation history. Jämtlands Flyg continued to operate until 2019, 45 years after his death.
