= Arådalen =

Valley in Sweden

Coordinates: 62°56′N 13°38′E

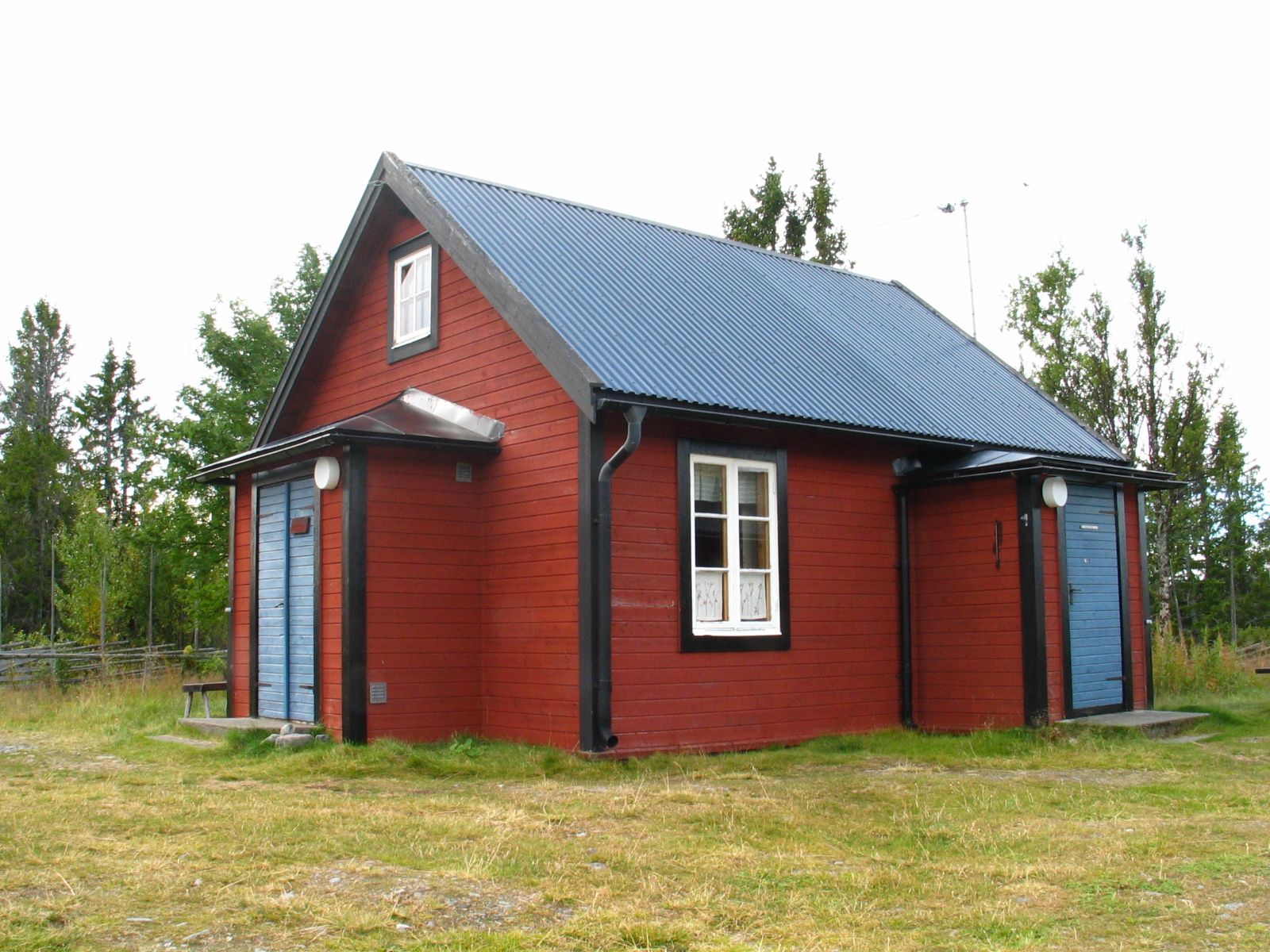
STF's Arådalen Tourist Station

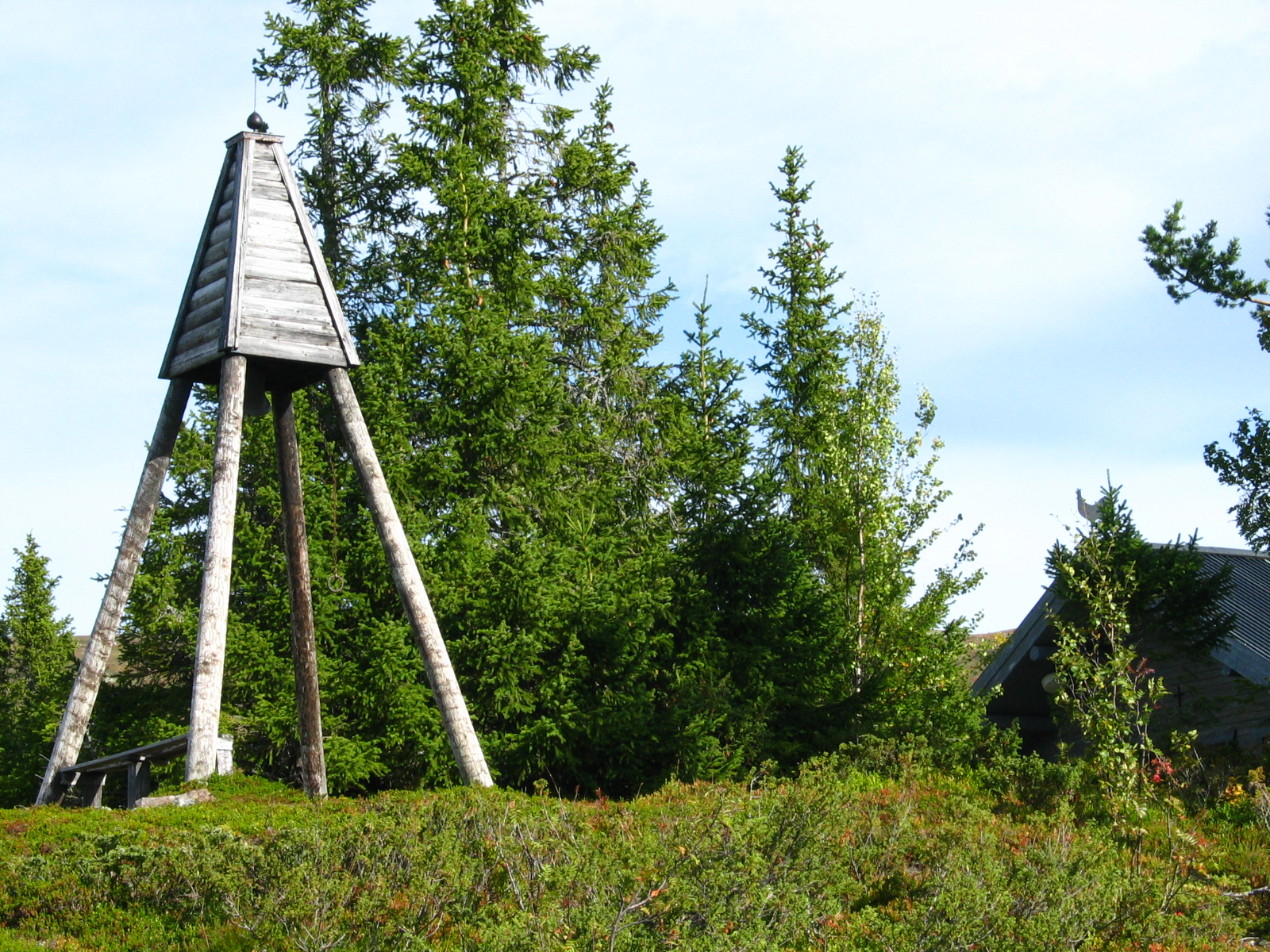
Bells at the Arådalen chapel

Arådalen is a valley immediately west of the mountain Hundshögen (1371 m) in southern Oviksfjällen, Oviken parish, Berg's Municipality, Jämtland, Sweden. It has been named after the watercourse Arån as from the valley is flowing southward.

In Arådalen is the Swedish Tourist Association (STF)'s oldest tourist station. The first small building was already erected in 1895. The current tourist station was then built In 1909 and it is now open only in the summer. The land is owned by the Swedish Church, but the tourist station is operated by the STF. Along with the station, there is a chapel built in the 1970s and two huts. The chapel is of the Church of Sweden, which also owns a large area of Arådalen. The tourist station and the chapel are located very near the Angelika dammed lake. The name suggests that there is plenty of angelica (Angelica archangelica) in the area. In Arådalen there are private recreation houses, but not a lift system. In the western part lies the same by (lapp camp) Glen with 4 four or five families. In the northern part of the valley is a long fence bulk by the laps to handle the reindeer. The road to Arådalen was built years from 1964 to 1965. Prior to that time, the area had no road. It is common to see reindeer with calves in the area. Glens lapp camp belongs to the Tossåsens sameby. The Glen Lake is reached by a short hike of 4 km in the unique natural landscape. The path to Glen Lake is lined by small cottage places where Sami long ago lived before they built their houses in Glen. You can also discover the old catch pits in the area. On the western side of the Glen Lake, there is the beautiful mountain Baltere. The area lies in the prohibition zone for driving with scooters in the winter. Glen Lake is known for its fine trout stocks with a record of over 9 kg. Sizes around the 3–5 kg is not uncommon. The lake is about 4 km long with some deep holes of 40 – 50 m. The main fishing season is from the ice freezing up to the melting of the ice.
