= Kusbölehelvetet =

Canyon in Sweden

Coordinates: 62°59′20.9754″N 14°07′15.1″E

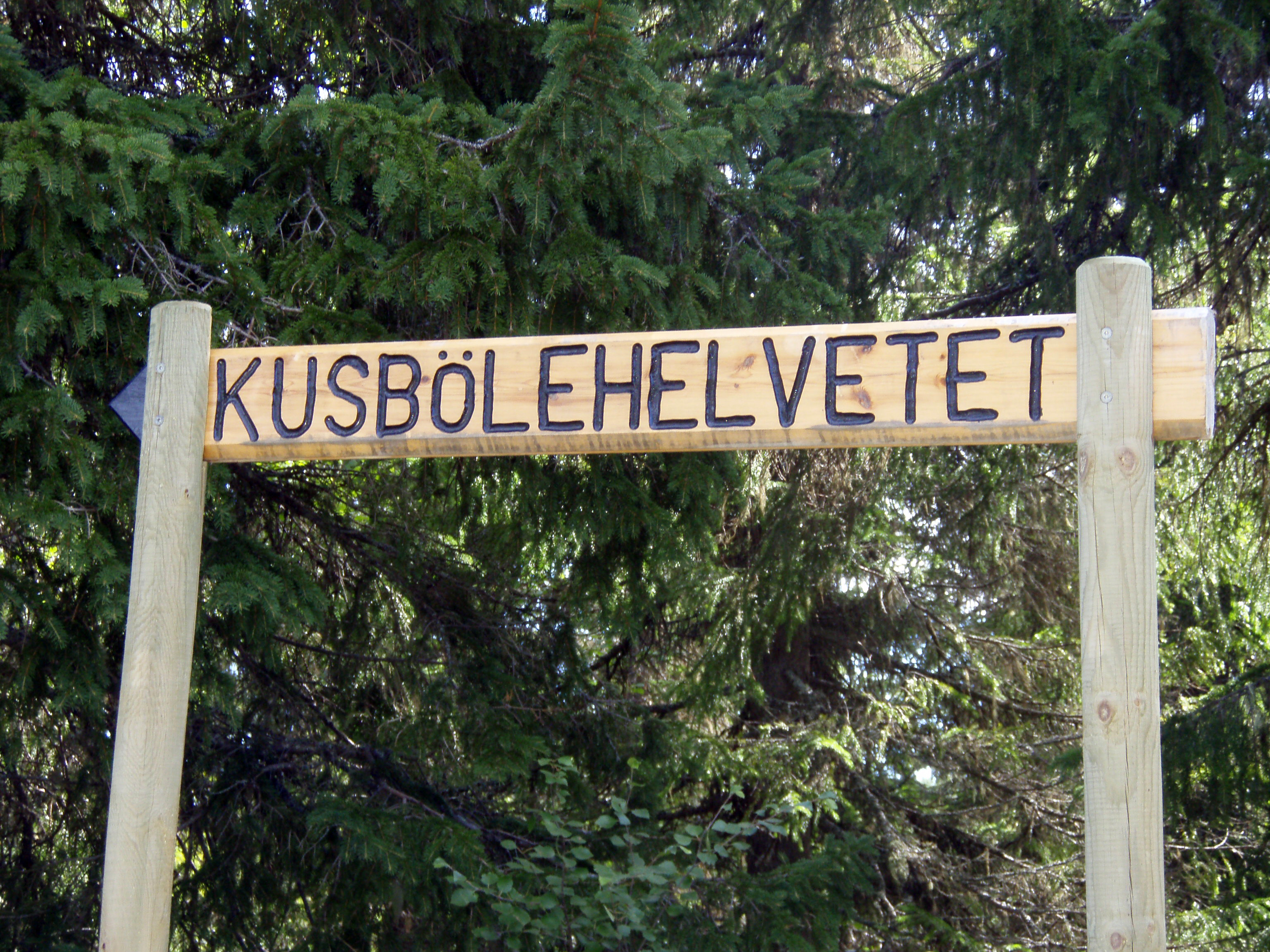
Signpost

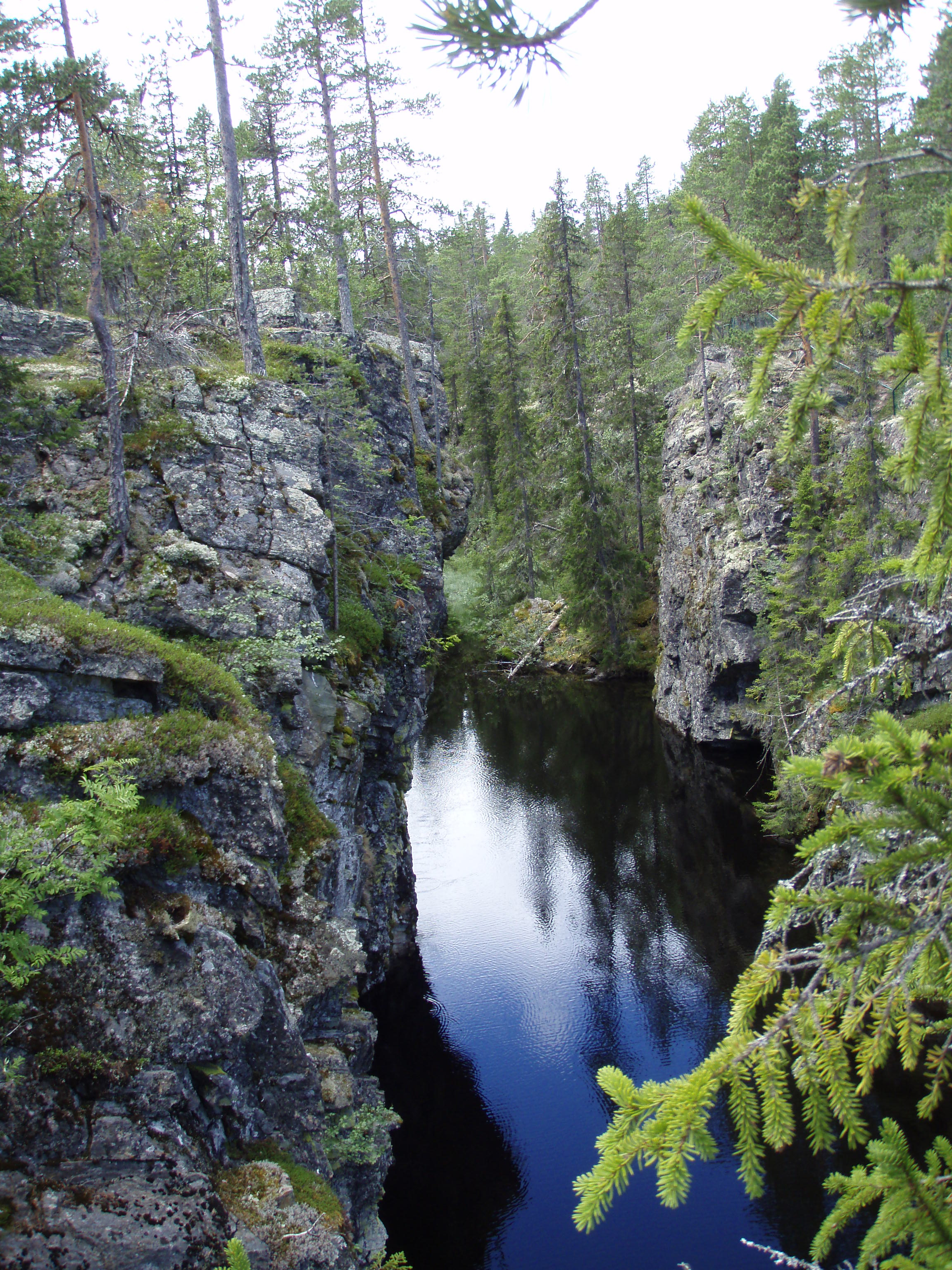
Kusbölehelvetet.

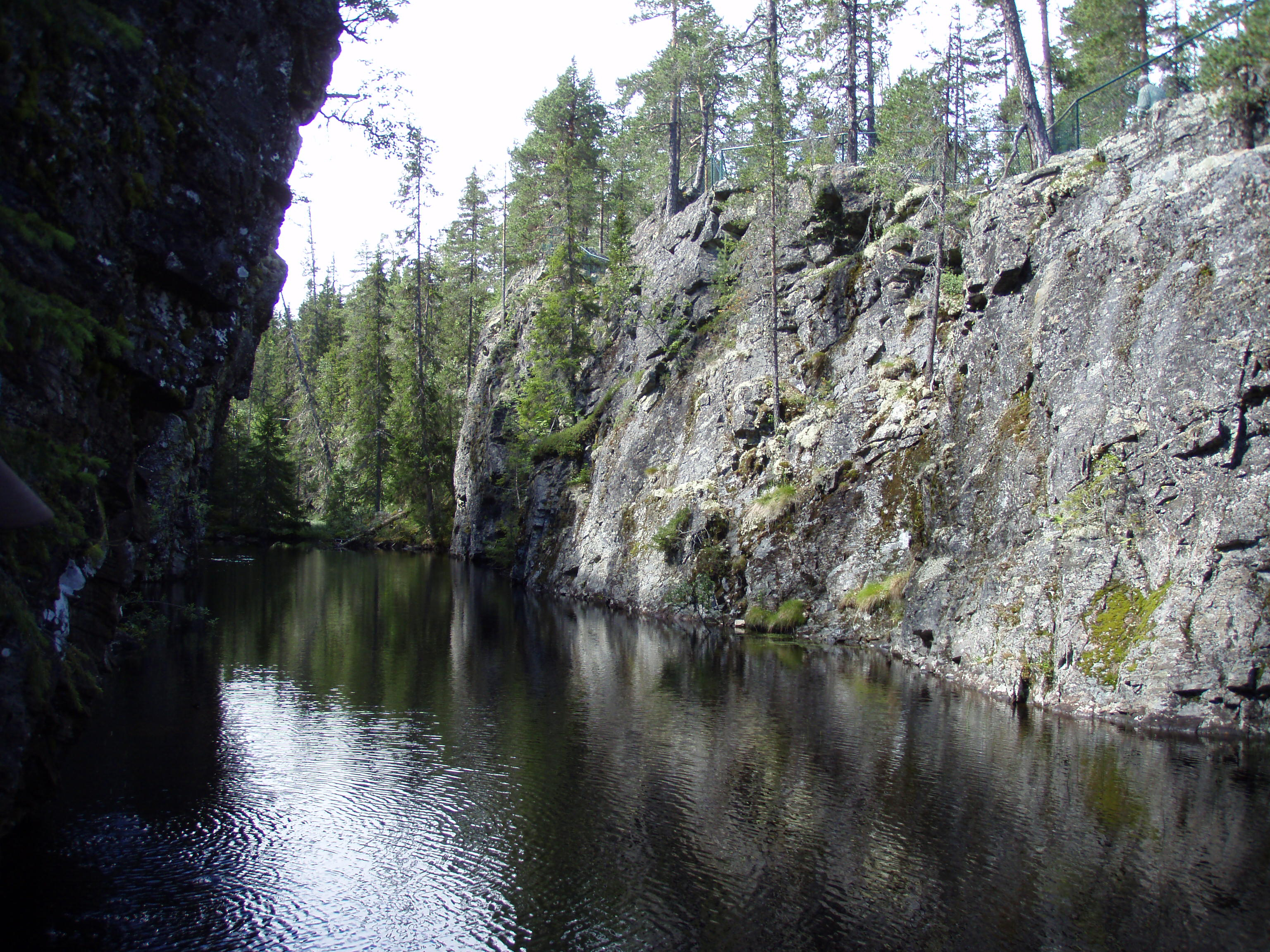
Kusbölehelvetet.

Kusbölehelvetet is a canyon near Gräftåvallen in Berg Municipality, Jämtland County, Sweden, through which runs Helvetesbäcken (Hell creek), home to Arctic char. A scenic tourist spot, the canyon is some 20 meters deep, runs some two kilometers long, and is graced with one of Sweden's most unpleasant place names.

Kusbölehelvetet is an old name, made up of three parts: kuse, meaning "bear" or "strongman"; böle, "settlement", and helvetet, Hell. However, the meanings have drifted so that in modern Swedish, kuse is a word for "horse", and böl, from the verb böla, a bellowing cry: to the modern Swedish speaker, the name (which was never very pleasant, ending in "Hell") means "The Hell of Horse Bellowing".

In 1993, musician Waldemar Swiergel named a piece for trombone quartet after Kusbölehelvetet.
