= Bruksvallsloppet =

International cross-country skiing event in Sweden

- Status: active
- Genre: sporting event
- Date: November
- Frequency: annual
- Location: Bruksvallarna
- Country: Sweden

Bruksvallsloppet is an annual, international cross-country skiing event, held in Bruksvallarna, Sweden over one weekend (Friday to Sunday) in November. The competitions act as FIS World Cup preselections. During some seasons, the event is the final before the World Cup opens, but the event may also take place between World Cup events. This depends on whether the FIS World Cup starts in late October or mid-late November.

In Sweden, the event is generally considered the first major competition of the season.
