= Berg Municipality =

Berg Municipality Bergs kommun
- Municipality
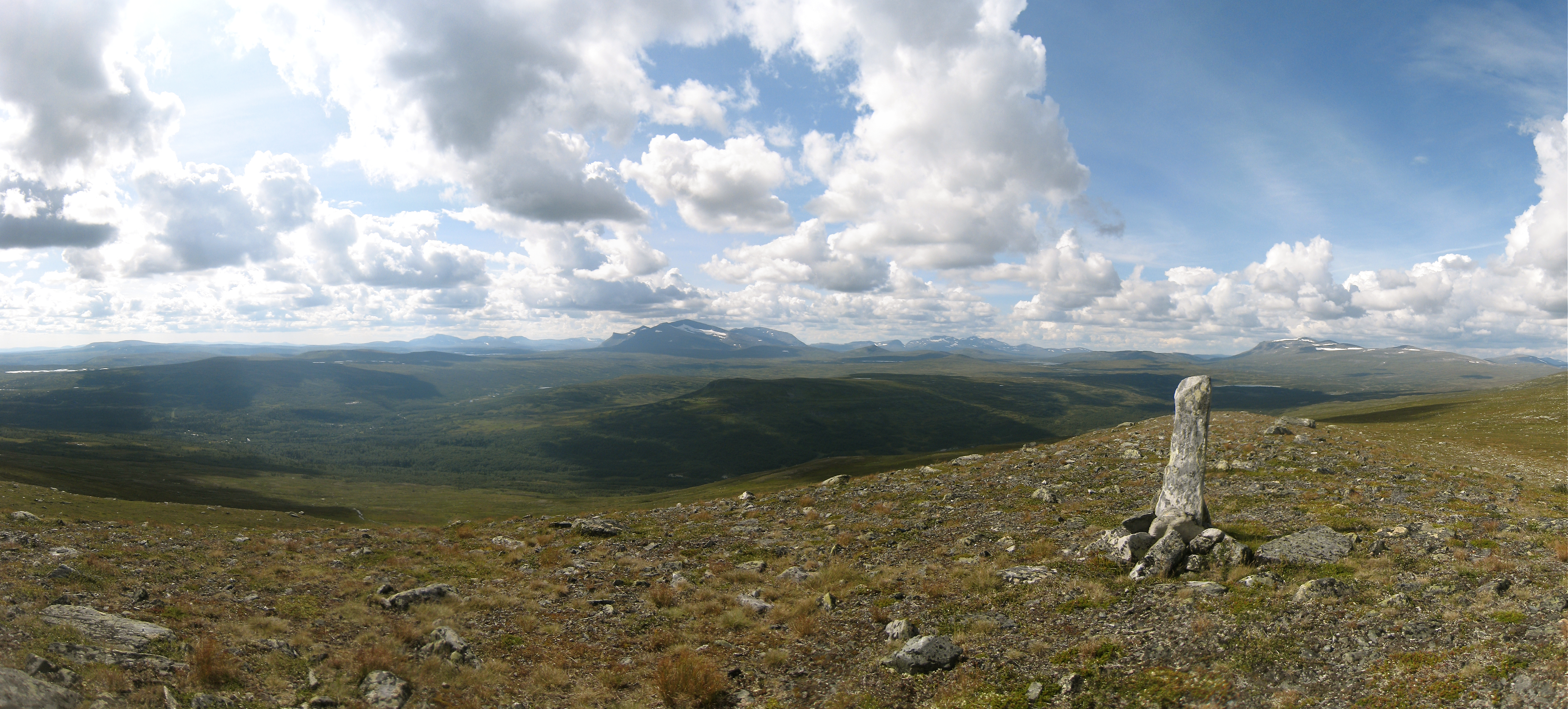
- View from Dunsjöfjället with Helagsfjället in the center

- Coat of arms

- Coordinates: 62°46′N 14°27′E
- Country: Sweden
- County: Jämtland County
- Seat: Svenstavik

Area
  - Total: 6,145.45 km^{2} (2,372.77 sq mi)
  - Land: 5,711.34 km^{2} (2,205.16 sq mi)
  - Water: 434.11 km^{2} (167.61 sq mi)
- Area as of 1 January 2014.

Population (30 June 2025)
  - Total: 7,101
  - Density: 1.243/km^{2} (3.220/sq mi)
- Time zone: UTC+1 (CET)
  - Summer (DST): UTC+2 (CEST)
- ISO 3166 code: SE
- Province: Jämtland and Härjedalen
- Municipal code: 2326
- Website: www.berg.se

Berg Municipality (Swedish: Bergs kommun, Southern Sami: Bïerjien tjïelte) is a municipality in Jämtland County in northern Sweden. Its seat is located in Svenstavik.

The present municipality was formed in 1971 when "old" Berg Municipality was amalgamated with four other entities.

As often in northern Sweden the municipality is one of the larger in terms of area, but one of the smaller in terms of population.

== Geography ==
The nature reserve Hoverberget lies within Berg Municipality, near Svenstavik. The high mountain Helags and Sweden's highest public road, over Flatruet, are located in the western end of Berg Municipality. Berg means mountain in Swedish, and the name of the municipality (and the Berg Parish) comes from Hoverberget.

=== Localities ===
There are six localities (or urban areas) in Berg Municipality:

#	Locality	Population
1	**Svenstavik**	948
2	Hackås	518
3	Klövsjö	312
4	Åsarna	271
5	Myrviken	224
6	Rätan	168

The municipal seat in bold

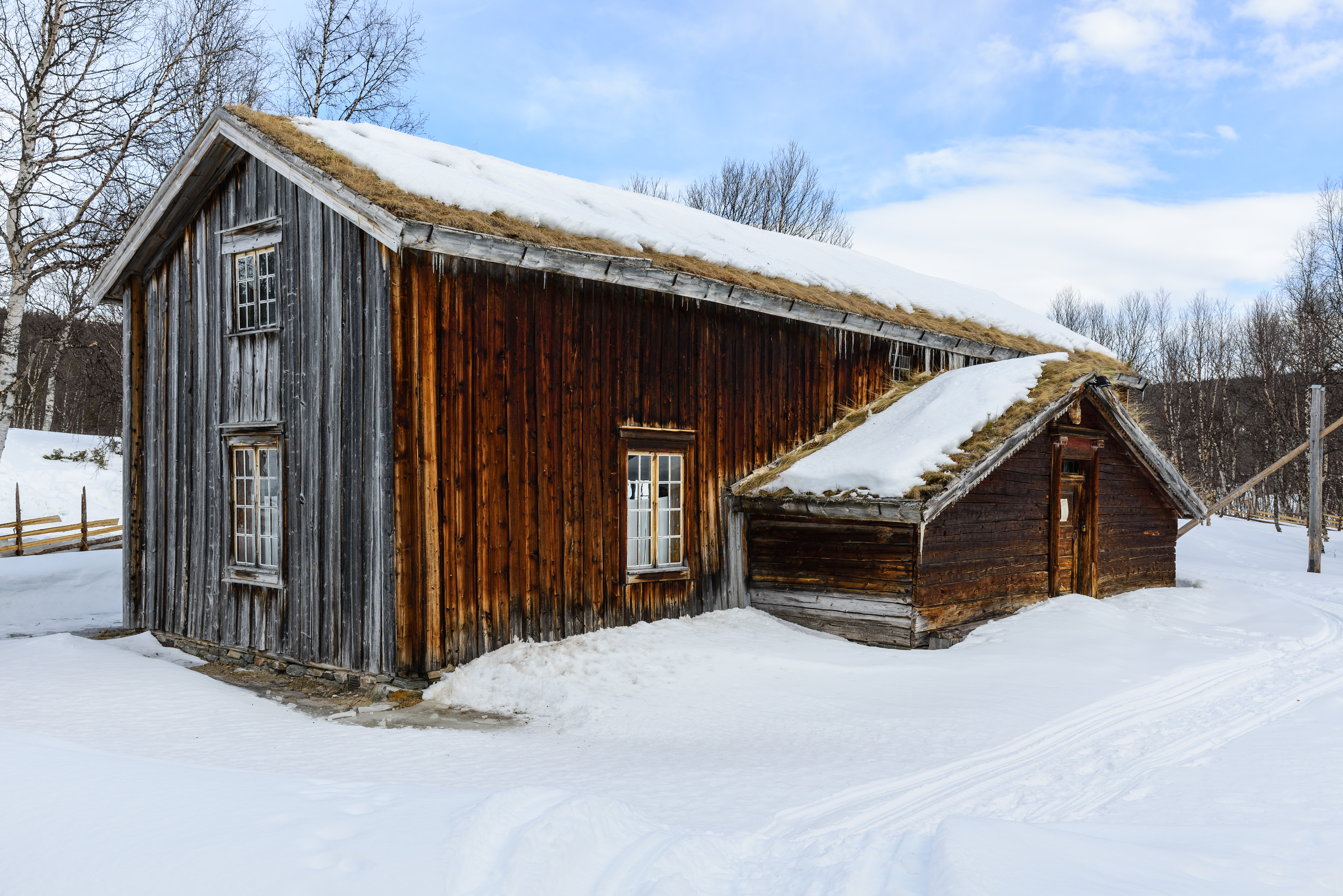
The oldest buildings in Ljungdalen (a small village in Berg). The house was probably built in the early 18th century, and is today part of a local heritage center.

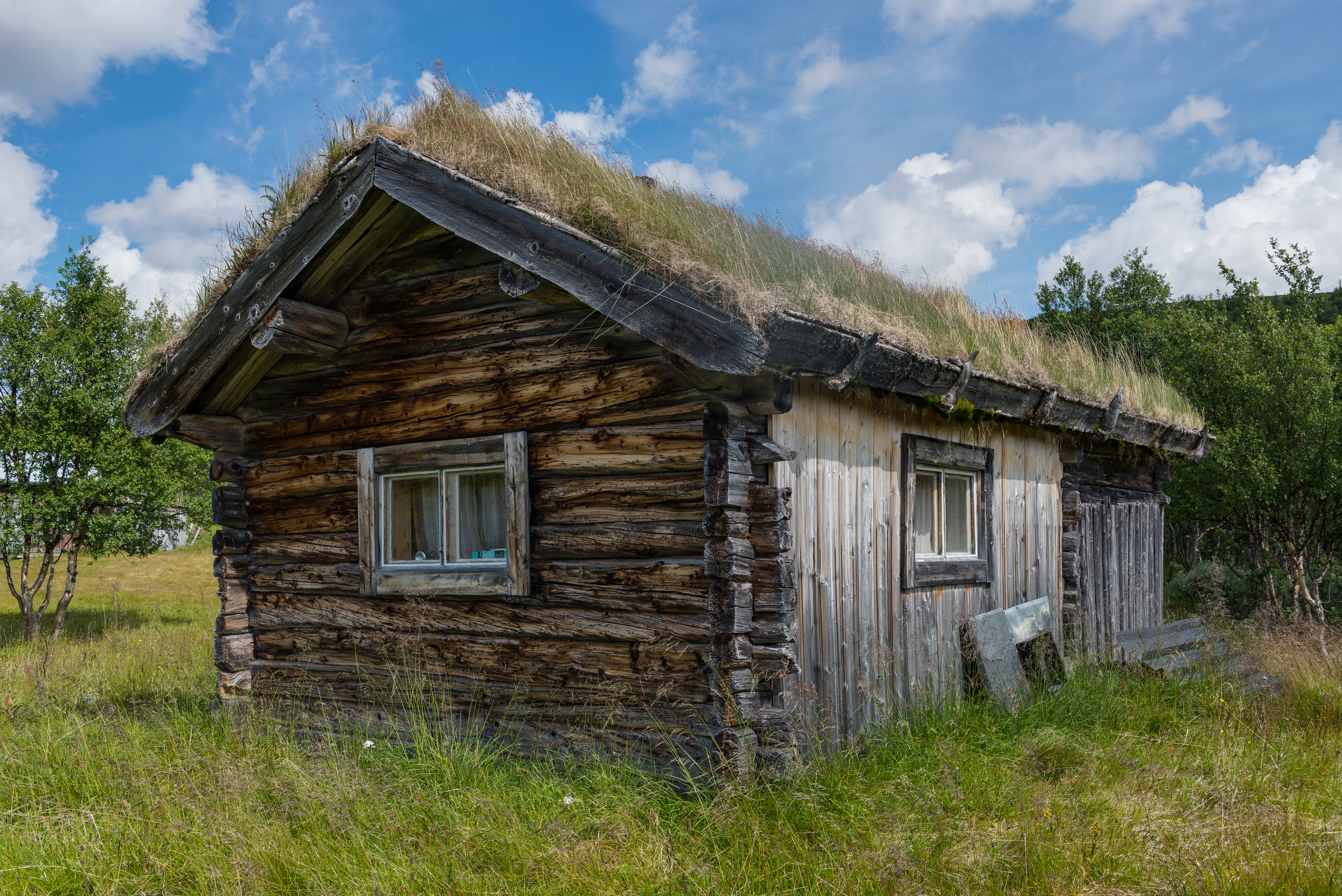
Building in Ljungris, owned by the Sámi community and used especially for Reindeer calf marking in the summer.

== Demographics ==
This is a demographic table based on Berg Municipality's electoral districts in the 2022 Swedish general election sourced from SVT's election platform, in turn taken from SCB official statistics.

In total there were 7,131 residents, including 5,527 Swedish citizens of voting age. 49.6% voted for the left coalition and 48.9% for the right coalition. Indicators are in percentage points except population totals and income.

Location	Residents	Citizen adults	Left vote	Right vote	Employed	Swedish parents	Foreign heritage	Income SEK	Degree
Location			%	%					
Hackås	1,036	823	51.4	46.8	85	95	5	24,650	33
Klövsjö-Rätan	1,067	846	47.4	51.6	83	92	8	20,650	28
Oviksbygden	1,786	1,394	49.1	48.8	87	96	4	22,903	32
Storsjö-Åsarna	898	729	44.4	53.6	86	91	9	22,151	25
Svenstavik-Vigge	2,344	1,735	52.5	46.7	80	82	18	21,612	25
Source: SVT

== Notable people ==
- Georg Adlersparre (1760–1835), Swedish army commander, born in Hovermo now part of Berg Municipality.
- Thomas Wassberg, resident here (born elsewhere), Olympic Gold medalist.

== See also ==
- Kusbölehelvetet
