= Göviken Heliport =

Göviken Heliport Göviken Helikopterlandningsplats
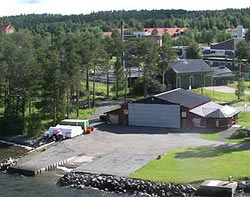
- IATA: none; ICAO: none

Summary
- Airport type: Private
- Owner: Jämtlands Flyg
- Operator: Jämtlands Flyg
- Location: Östersund, Sweden
- Elevation AMSL: 1,552 ft / 473 m
- Coordinates: 63°11′33″N 14°37′53″E
- Website: Official website of Göviken Heliport
- Interactive map of Göviken Heliport

Helipads
Number	Length		Surface
Number	ft	m	Surface
H1	100	30	Asphalt

Statistics (2008)
- Aircraft movements: 750

Göviken Heliport, Östersund is the home base of Jämtlands Flyg AB helicopter company. The base is located near central Östersund city.

== See also ==
- List of the largest airports in the Nordic countries
