= Klövsjö =

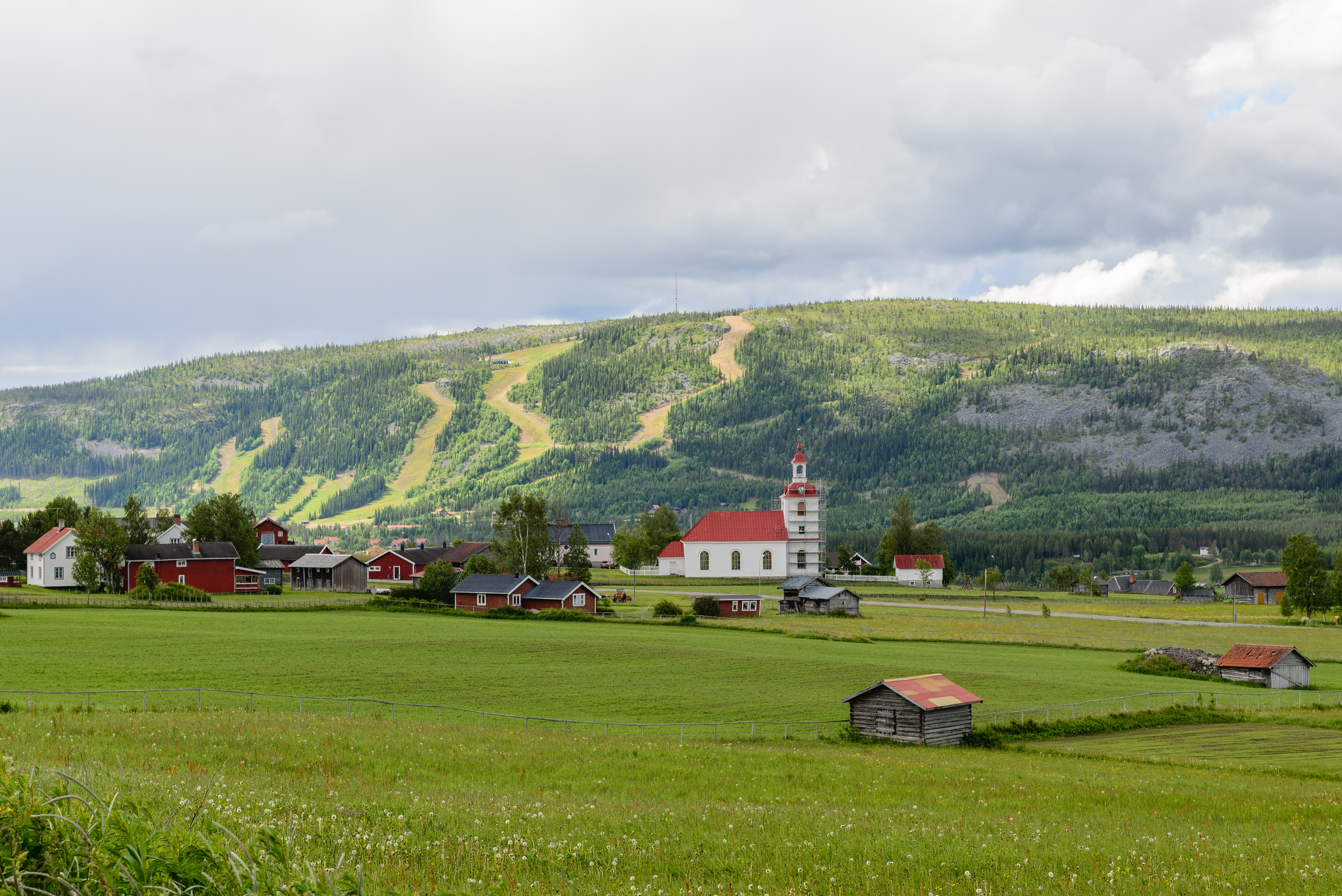
- June 2014 view of Klövsjö with Klövsjö Church and the skiing hills seen in the background

- Location within Jämtland Location within Sweden
- Coordinates: 62°32′N 14°12′E
- Country: Sweden
- Province: Jämtland
- County: Jämtland County
- Municipality: Berg Municipality

Area
  - Total: 2.22 km^{2} (0.86 sq mi)

Population (31 December 2010)
  - Total: 291
  - Density: 131/km^{2} (340/sq mi)
- Time zone: UTC+1 (CET)
  - Summer (DST): UTC+2 (CEST)

Klövsjö is a locality situated in Berg Municipality, Jämtland County, Sweden with 291 inhabitants in 2010.
