= Tänndalen =

Coordinates: 62.5444°N 12.3333°E

Tänndalen Tänndalen
- minor locality
- Interactive map of Tänndalen
- Swedish county: Jämtland
- Municipalities of Sweden: Härjedalen

Population (2010)
  - Total: 66
- Time zone: UTC+1 (CET)
  - Summer (DST): UTC+2 (CEST)

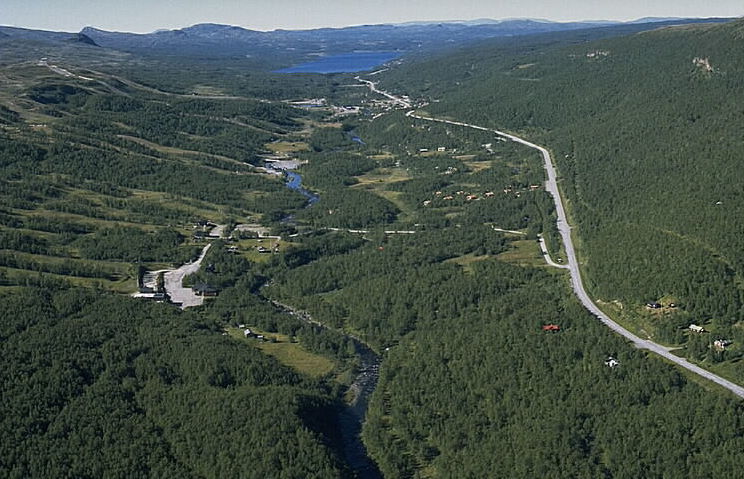
Hamra - KMB - 16000300024194

Tänndalen, Southern Sami: Teanndaelie, is a minor locality in Härjedalen Municipality, Sweden. It had 66 inhabitants in 2010.

== Climate ==
Climate data for Fjällnäs 1991-2020 normals (780m)
Month	Jan	Feb	Mar	Apr	May	Jun	Jul	Aug	Sep	Oct	Nov	Dec	Year
Mean daily maximum °C (°F)	−3.5 (25.7)	−3.5 (25.7)	−1.0 (30.2)	3.2 (37.8)	8.8 (47.8)	13.8 (56.8)	16.8 (62.2)	15.2 (59.4)	10.7 (51.3)	4.2 (39.6)	−0.6 (30.9)	−2.7 (27.1)	5.1 (41.2)
Daily mean °C (°F)	−8.2 (17.2)	−8.1 (17.4)	−5.6 (21.9)	−1.3 (29.7)	3.7 (38.7)	8.2 (46.8)	11.1 (52.0)	9.8 (49.6)	5.8 (42.4)	0.2 (32.4)	−4.6 (23.7)	−7.6 (18.3)	0.3 (32.5)
Mean daily minimum °C (°F)	−11.5 (11.3)	−11.9 (10.6)	−9.6 (14.7)	−4.9 (23.2)	−0.2 (31.6)	4.1 (39.4)	7.0 (44.6)	6.3 (43.3)	2.9 (37.2)	−2.0 (28.4)	−7.1 (19.2)	−10.4 (13.3)	−3.1 (26.4)
Average precipitation mm (inches)	67.5 (2.66)	54.0 (2.13)	48.9 (1.93)	39.3 (1.55)	58.1 (2.29)	81.4 (3.20)	100.2 (3.94)	99.1 (3.90)	67.4 (2.65)	73.3 (2.89)	66.7 (2.63)	61.6 (2.43)	817.6 (32.19)
Source: NOAA
