= Åsarna =

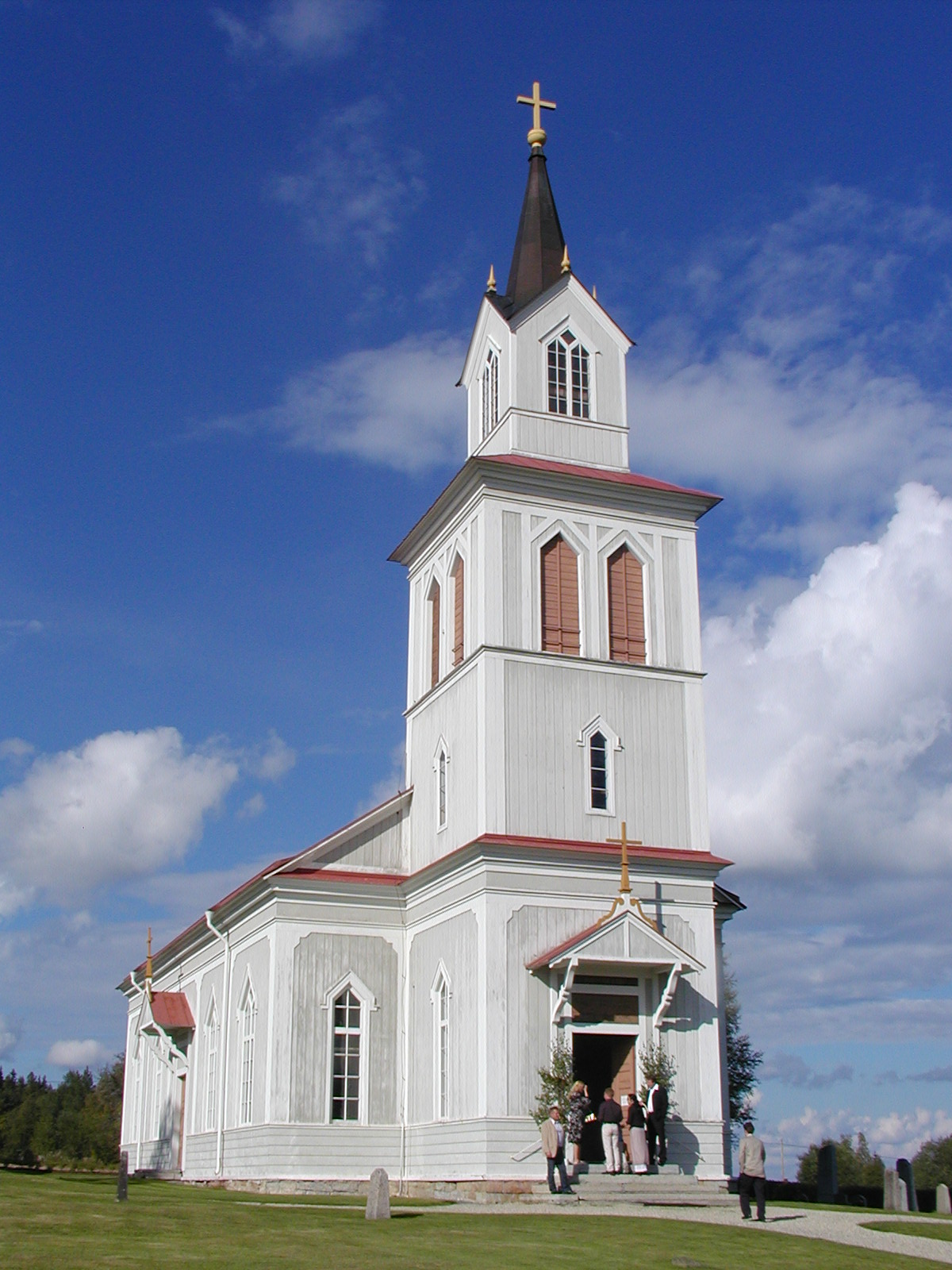
- Åsarne Old Church

- Location within Jämtland Location within Sweden
- Coordinates: 62°39′N 14°21′E
- Country: Sweden
- Province: Jämtland
- County: Jämtland County
- Municipality: Berg Municipality

Area
  - Total: 0.65 km^{2} (0.25 sq mi)

Population (31 December 2010)
  - Total: 268
  - Density: 415/km^{2} (1,070/sq mi)
- Time zone: UTC+1 (CET)
  - Summer (DST): UTC+2 (CEST)

Åsarna, older spelling: Åsarne, is a locality situated in Berg Municipality, Jämtland County, Sweden with 268 inhabitants in 2010.
