= Bruksvallarna =

Coordinates: 62°38′N 12°26′E

Bruksvallarna Bruksvallarna
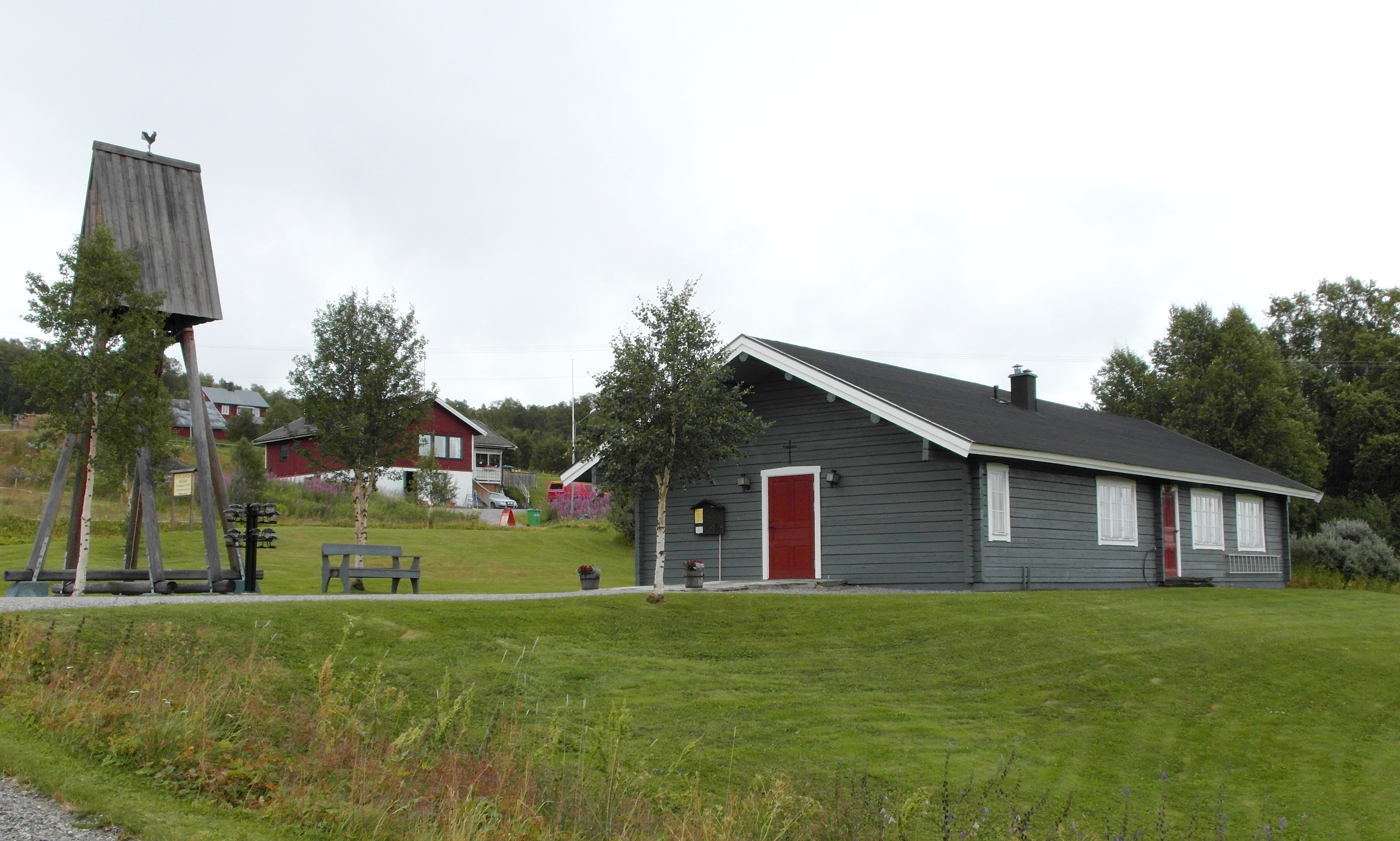
- Bruksvallarna Chapel
- Interactive map of Bruksvallarna
- Swedish county: Jämtland
- Municipalities of Sweden: Härjedalen

Population (2010)
  - Total: 95
- Time zone: UTC+1 (CET)
  - Summer (DST): UTC+2 (CEST)

Bruksvallarna is a village situated in Härjedalen Municipality in Jämtland County, Sweden. Its relatively high altitude, 720 meters, provides a long ski season. Bruksvallsloppet, an international Cross-country skiing competition, is held annually in Bruksvallarna during the month of November. The village had 95 inhabitants in 2010.

Bruksvallarna Chapel was inaugurated on 2 September 1978. The chapel has a stand-alone bell tower erected in 1980. It is in the parish of Tännäs-Ljusnedal (Tännäs-Ljusnedals församling) in the Diocese of Härnösand.
