= Ljusnedal =

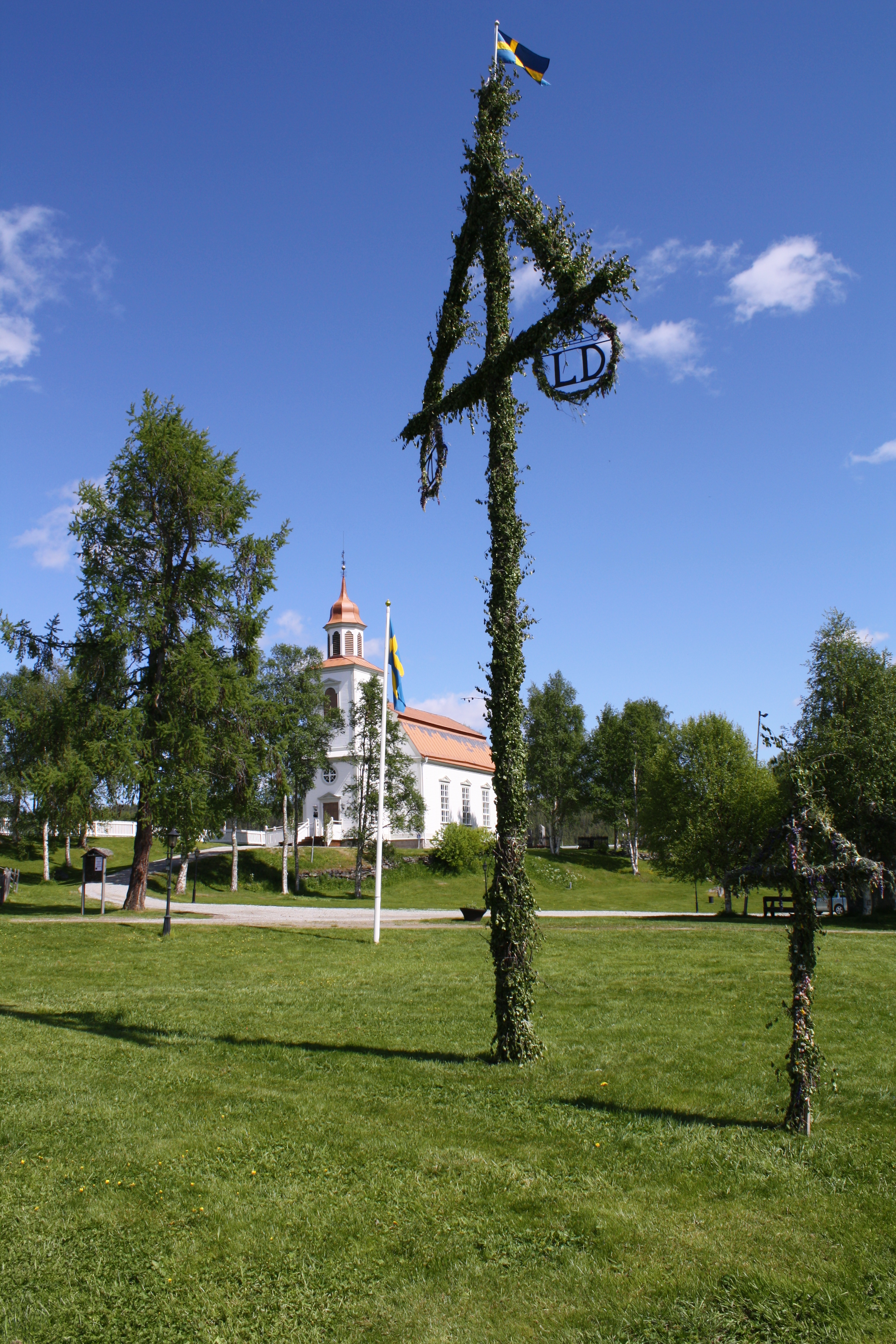
- Maypole in Ljusnedal

- Location within Jämtland Location within Sweden
- Coordinates: 62°32′14.60″N 12°36′43.09″E
- Country: Sweden
- Province: Härjedalen
- County: Jämtland County
- Municipality: Härjedalen Municipality
- Time zone: UTC+1 (CET)
  - Summer (DST): UTC+2 (CEST)

Ljusnedal (Swedish pronunciation: [jɵsnɛˈdɑːl]) is a village and parish in Härjedalen Municipality in Jämtland County, Sweden. Ljusnedal Church (Ljusnedals kyrka) is a wooden church built in 1796. The interior is characterized by renovation conducted during 1902. The altarpiece is painted by the artist Sven Linnborg (1857-1932). The church is associated with the Tännäs-Ljusnedal parish in the Diocese of Härnösand.

== Climate ==
Climate data for Ljusnedal 2002–2021 (extremes since 1917)
Month	Jan	Feb	Mar	Apr	May	Jun	Jul	Aug	Sep	Oct	Nov	Dec	Year
Record high °C (°F)	9.5 (49.1)	9.9 (49.8)	14.5 (58.1)	18.6 (65.5)	27.3 (81.1)	31.0 (87.8)	30.1 (86.2)	28.7 (83.7)	25.7 (78.3)	21.0 (69.8)	11.6 (52.9)	8.2 (46.8)	31.0 (87.8)
Mean maximum °C (°F)	3.5 (38.3)	5.0 (41.0)	8.3 (46.9)	13.1 (55.6)	21.7 (71.1)	24.4 (75.9)	25.9 (78.6)	23.9 (75.0)	19.8 (67.6)	13.3 (55.9)	6.9 (44.4)	4.8 (40.6)	27.0 (80.6)
Mean daily maximum °C (°F)	−5.1 (22.8)	−2.6 (27.3)	1.4 (34.5)	6.2 (43.2)	11.8 (53.2)	16.6 (61.9)	19.2 (66.6)	17.4 (63.3)	12.6 (54.7)	5.7 (42.3)	−0.4 (31.3)	−3.7 (25.3)	6.6 (43.9)
Daily mean °C (°F)	−10.4 (13.3)	−8.4 (16.9)	−4.9 (23.2)	0.5 (32.9)	5.7 (42.3)	10.3 (50.5)	13.0 (55.4)	11.3 (52.3)	7.4 (45.3)	1.4 (34.5)	−4.6 (23.7)	−8.6 (16.5)	1.1 (33.9)
Mean daily minimum °C (°F)	−15.7 (3.7)	−14.2 (6.4)	−11.2 (11.8)	−5.2 (22.6)	−0.4 (31.3)	4.0 (39.2)	6.7 (44.1)	5.2 (41.4)	2.1 (35.8)	−2.9 (26.8)	−8.8 (16.2)	−13.4 (7.9)	−4.5 (23.9)
Mean minimum °C (°F)	−31.4 (−24.5)	−30.7 (−23.3)	−27.3 (−17.1)	−16.6 (2.1)	−7.2 (19.0)	−3.0 (26.6)	−0.7 (30.7)	−2.5 (27.5)	−5.6 (21.9)	−14.0 (6.8)	−21.9 (−7.4)	−28.0 (−18.4)	−34.1 (−29.4)
Record low °C (°F)	−47.0 (−52.6)	−44.0 (−47.2)	−39.6 (−39.3)	−30.8 (−23.4)	−17.5 (0.5)	−8.3 (17.1)	−4.0 (24.8)	−7.3 (18.9)	−14.0 (6.8)	−27.2 (−17.0)	−37.0 (−34.6)	−45.0 (−49.0)	−47.0 (−52.6)
Average precipitation mm (inches)	39.5 (1.56)	26.4 (1.04)	25.0 (0.98)	22.6 (0.89)	48.1 (1.89)	65.5 (2.58)	87.7 (3.45)	76.3 (3.00)	53.1 (2.09)	46.8 (1.84)	41.9 (1.65)	35.0 (1.38)	567.9 (22.35)
Average extreme snow depth cm (inches)	46 (18)	54 (21)	57 (22)	42 (17)	4 (1.6)	0 (0)	0 (0)	0 (0)	0 (0)	7 (2.8)	19 (7.5)	29 (11)	59 (23)
Source 1: SMHI Open Data for Ljusnedal, temperature
Source 2: SMHI Open Data for Ljusnedal, precipitation

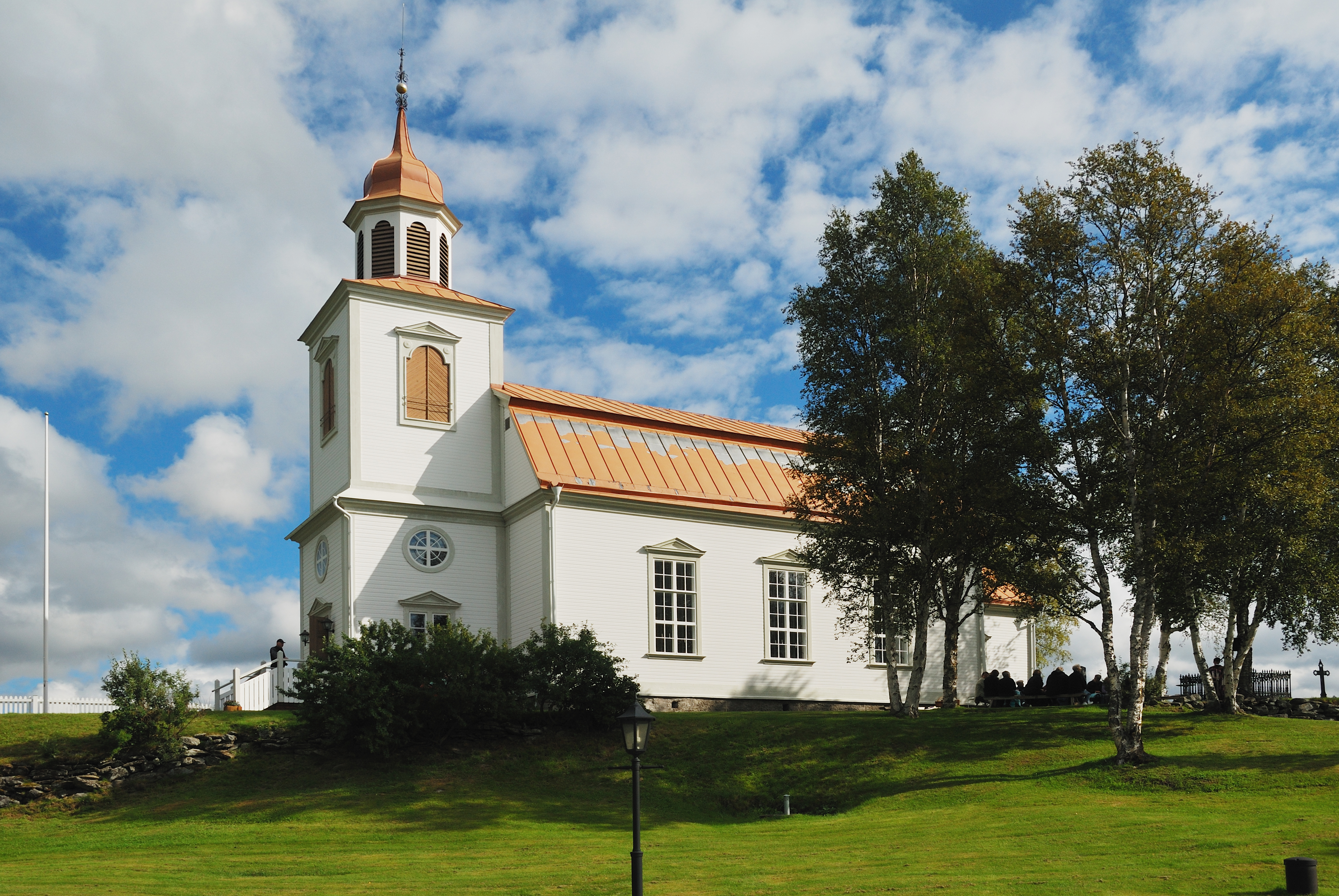
Ljusnedal Church
