= Offerdal =

Historical administrative division of Sweden

Coordinates: 63°27′N 13°59′E

Offerdal is a parish (so called socken) and former municipality (pop. 2,100) in Krokom Municipality, Jämtland in the middle of Sweden. The seat of the former municipality Offerdal, Änge, is situated 50 kilometres northwest of Östersund, the capital of Jämtland.

== Geography and culture ==
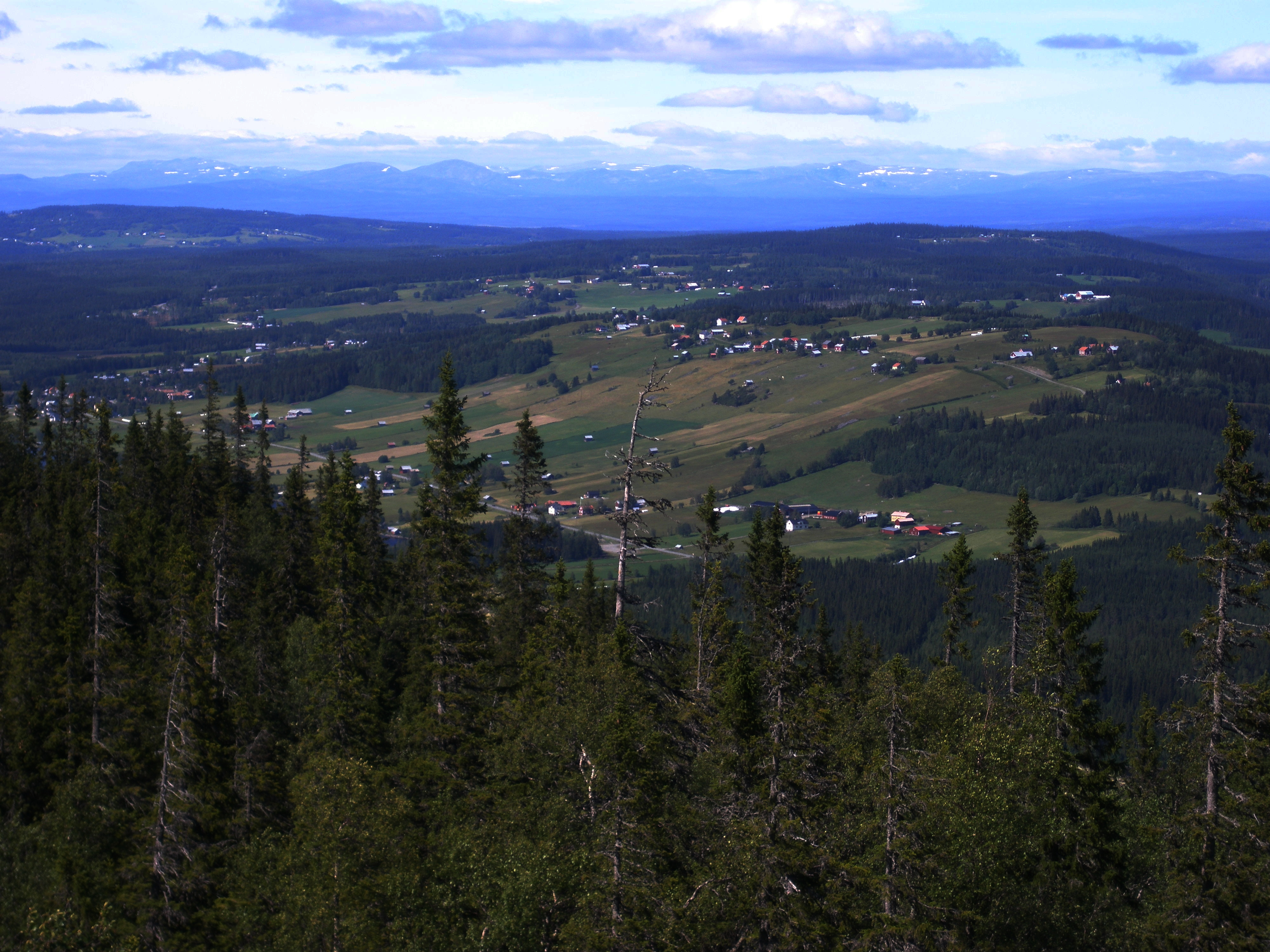
Kaxås in Offerdal

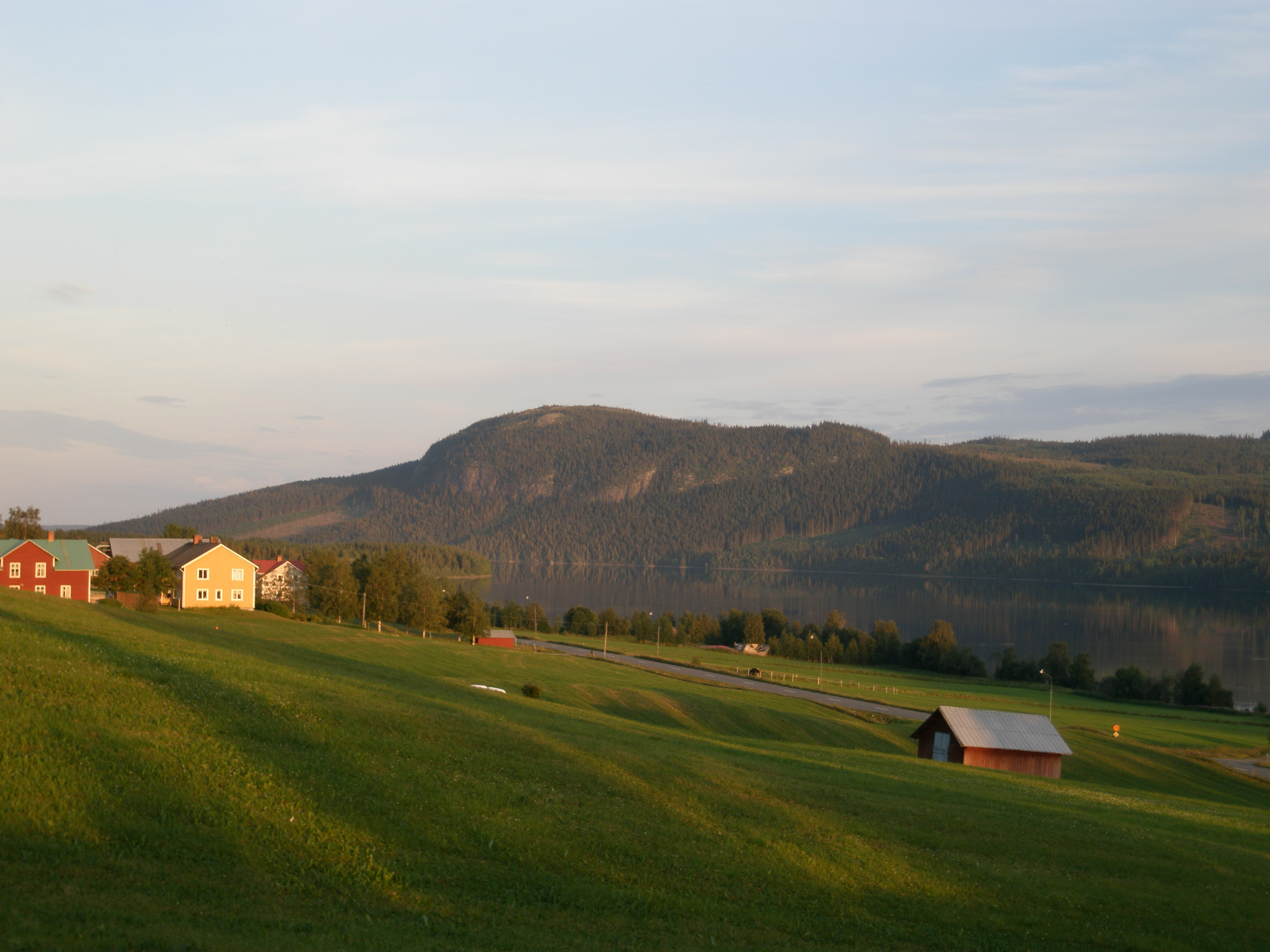
The mountain Hällberget in Offerdal

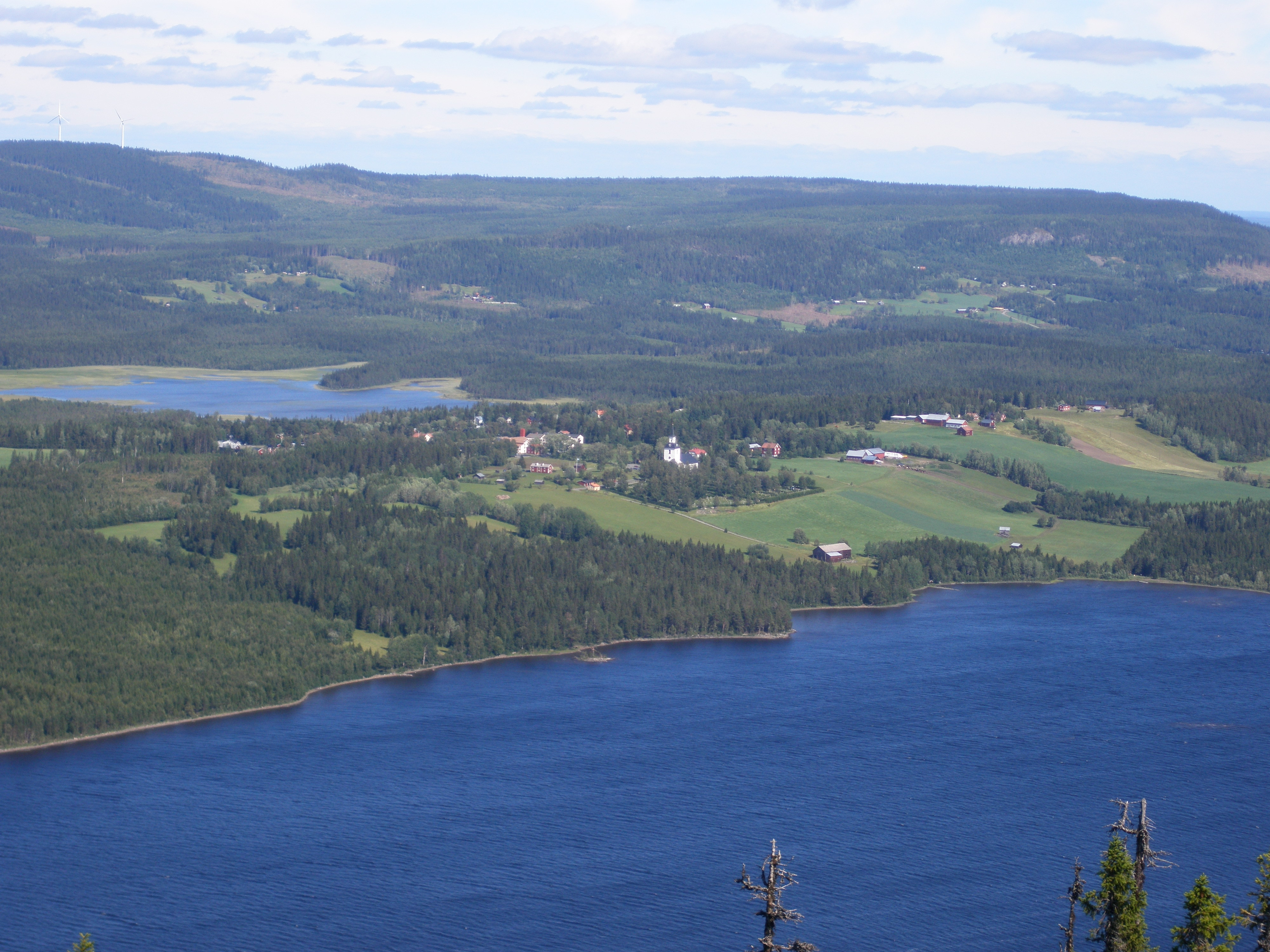
Ede in Offerdal

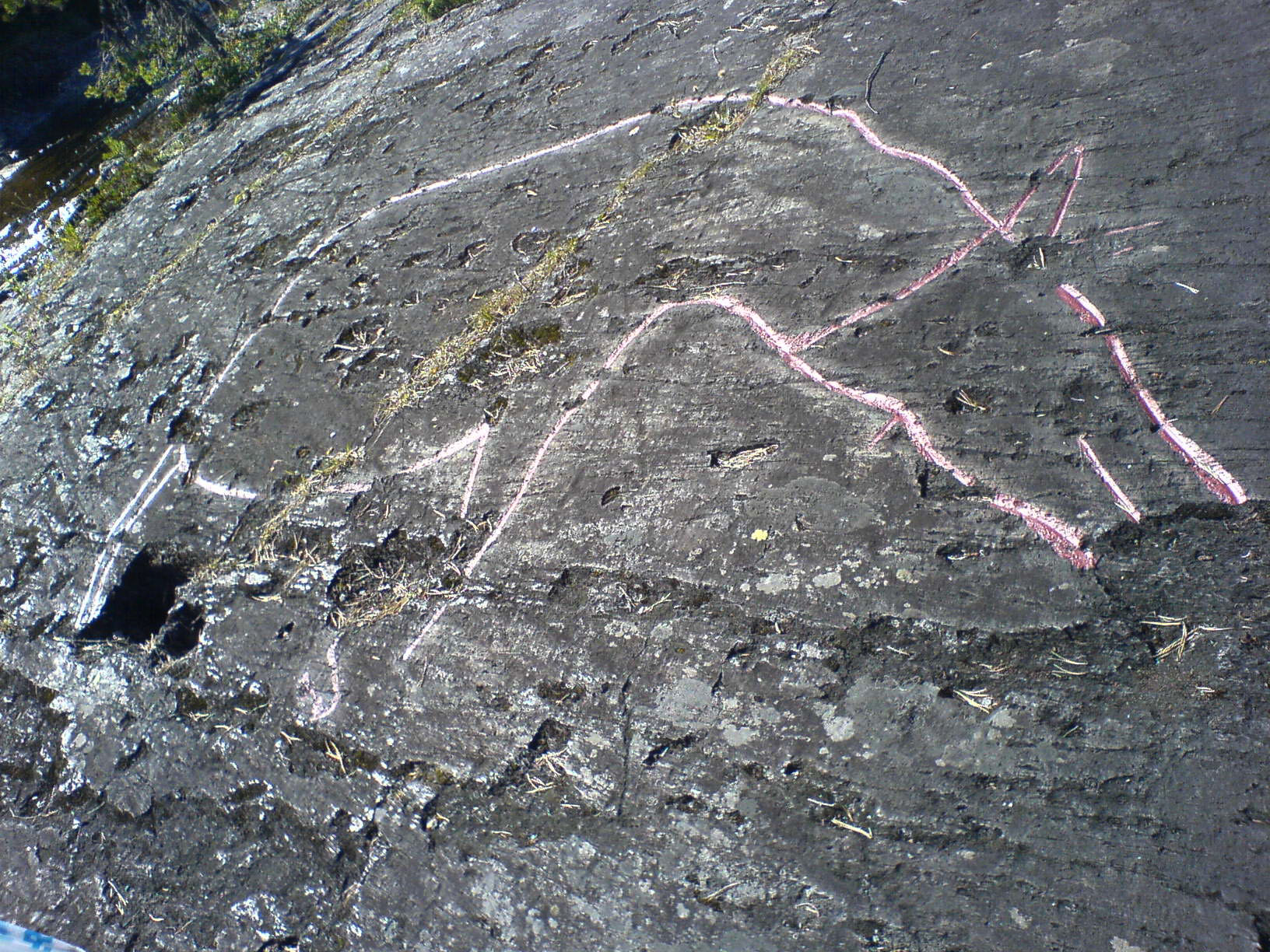
Petroglyphs in Gärde in the north of Offerdal

Offerdal is a highland region with the highest peak being Makkene, a peak in the Oldfjällen mountain range with an altitude of 1 266 meters above sea level.

The south of Offerdal is a genuine agricultural area with a long history. In today’s Offerdal, farming is less important, but is still an important part of the local culture.

The Sami people live in the mountain area in the north of Offerdal, in the villages Jänsmässholmen, Frankrike and Olden. The Sami in Offerdal are Southern Sami people and speak Southern Sami.

== History ==
Jämtland has over 20 000 documented ancient monuments, the oldest one being an 8 000 year old arrowhead found in 1881 nearby Kaxås in Offerdal (Offerdalsspetsen). Petroglyphs in Gärde in the north of Offerdal were made approximately 7 000 years ago. These carvings consist primely of moose.

Offerdal and other parts of Jämtland were Christianized in the middle of the 11th century. The church of Offerdal was built in the 12th century in Ede in central Offerdal. During the Norwegian time (1178-1645), Offerdal was one of the biggest municipalities in Jämtland. In 1645 Sweden received Offerdal as a part of the Treaty of Brömsebro.

The etymology of the name Offerdal is Old Norse Áflóadalr which roughly translates to 'the valley of the river running through the bog' (á = 'river, flói = 'bog', dalr = 'valley'). Because Jamtlandic l in a post-f position is pronounced as a retroflex r, the false etymological "Offerdal" with offer = '(ritual) sacrifice' was introduced in documents when referring to the area.

== Localities ==
- Änge
- Kaxås
- Ede
- Tulleråsen
- Rönnöfors
- Jänsmässholmen
- Olden
- Landön
- Kälom
- Åflo

== Notable people ==
- Göran Boström, Swedish artist from Änge, Offerdal
- Carl-Göran Ekerwald, Swedish author from Änge, Offerdal
- Lapp-Nils, violinist and composer of Swedish folk music
- Dan Olofsson, Swedish entrepreneur and philanthropist from Kaxås in Offerdal
- Torkel Persson, cross country skier from Frankrike in Offerdal
