= Star Life =

Star Life may refer to:

- Star Life (Africa), an Indian English-language television channel available in Sub-Saharan Africa
- Star Life (international), formerly Fox Life, a television channel brand owned by The Walt Disney Company
  - Star Life (Latin America)
  - Star Life (India)

== See also ==
- Stellar evolution, the evolution of stars
- Star of Life, a symbol of emergency medical services
- Star for Life, a Swedish/South African school programme
- Lifestar, a transport service at the University of Tennessee Medical Center
