= Sigma AB =

Swedish IT company group

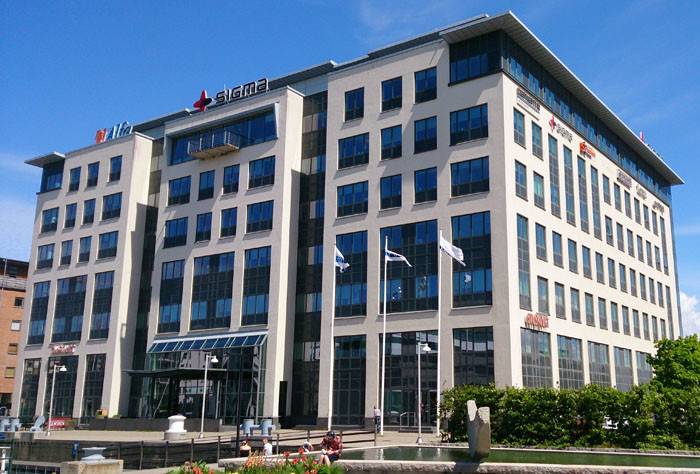
- Sigma AB HQ in Malmö, Sweden
- Company type: Private
- Industry: Consulting services for IT, Energy, Industry and Infrastructure projects
- Founded: 1986; 40 years ago
- Founder: Dan Olofsson (Chairman)
- Headquarters: Malmö, Sweden
- Owner: Danir AB
- Number of employees: 5000 (August 2022)
- Website: www.sigma.se

Sigma AB (or Sigma Group) is a group of companies carrying out consultancy operations within IT, information logistics, engineering services, technical R&D, industry and social structure.

Sigma AB offers its services through the business areas Sigma Technology, Sigma Connectivity, Sigma Industry and Sigma Software, within which Sigma AB provides group management and manages the overall Sigma brand. It was listed on Stockholm Stock Exchange Small Cap list and NASDAQ OMX until 2013.

== History ==
In 1993 Dan Olofsson purchased the technical consulting department of tech company Sapia and renamed it Sigma. Three years later the company employed 600 people and was listed on the Stockholm Stock Exchange.

By 1999 Sigma had grown in size to 5 000 employees in seven countries and a turnover of 1.4 billion SEK. The company struck a deal with Ericsson, becoming a "strategic partner" while expanding into wireless communications solutions. In 2008 Askerö Utveckling offered to buy the company at 6.9 SEK per share for a total valuation of 599 million SEK. At the time Dan Olofssons holding company was a major shareholder controlling 31% of the shares.

Sigma AB was listed on the Stockholm Stock Exchange Small Cap list and NASDAQ OMX. On 8 May 2013, Sigma requested that the company be delisted from NASDAQ OMX on 21 May that same year, after Danir AB acquired over 95% of the shares in the company. At the same time, Danir requested that the remaining shares be compulsorily redeemed. Since then, the company has been a wholly owned subsidiary of Danir AB, which the Olofsson family owns. At the time, the company had 1400 employees.

The company was first split into three businesses in 2001. Among the specific engagements the company started after 2001 was a 2008 arrangement with AstraZeneca to outsource clinical trial data management, thereby reducing need for personnel at its U.S. headquarters in Delaware, which was in line with data management trends in the pharmaceutical industry at the time. Noteworthy also were a 2009 arrangement with BTG Instruments AB to outsource technical documentation; a 2011 win of a competitive contract to run IT functions for a new Swedish subsidiary of the Finnish energy firm Fortum; and winning a contract competition to provide software services for an upgrade project for the public transport systems of Stockholm County.

In 2010, Sigma acquired the Swedish peer competitor Cypoint, a firm established in 1996 with 100 employees across three Swedish sites. In 2013, Sigma acquired a part of Sony Mobile and renamed it Sigma Connectivity. In 2014 the company was structured into six business areas: Sigma IT Consulting, Sigma Connectivity, Sigma Industry, Sigma Civil, Sigma Software and Sigma Technology.

== Sigma Software ==
In 2006 Sigma AB bought a controlling stake (60%) in Kharkiv-based Ukrainian IT-company Eclipse for 8,7 million SEK. By 2014 the company had grown to 500 employees and new offices were opened in Kyiv, Warsaw and Silicon Valley. At the eve of the Russian invasion of Ukraine activities were temporarily shuttered, pending evacuation and relocation of employees, growing the Lviv office and opening several new local branches in Western Ukraine. A few hundred employees were relocated within Europe, mostly to Hungary and Poland. The company, employing 2 000 workers including 150 consultants, reported resumption of normal activities within two months of the invasion.

In 2023, Sigma AB entered the top 200 companies in terms of revenue in 2022.
