= Farmen (Swedish TV series) season 11 =

Farmen
- Season 11
- Presented by: Paolo Roberto
- No. of days: 68
- No. of housemates: 18
- Winner: Stefan Eriksson
- Runner-up: Helena Hedqvist

Release
- Original network: TV4
- Original release: January 7 – March 18, 2018

Farmen 2018 (The Farm 2018) was the 11th season of the Swedish version of The Farm reality television show. The show premiered on January 7, 2018 on TV4.

== Format ==
Twelve contestants are chosen from the outside world. Each week one contestant is selected the Farmer of the Week. In the first week, the contestants choose the Farmer. Since week 2, the Farmer is chosen by the contestant evicted in the previous week.

=== Nomination process ===
The Farmer of the Week nominates two people (a man and a woman) as the Butlers. The others must decide which Butler is the first to go to the Battle. That person then chooses the second person (from the same sex) for the Battle and also the type of battle (a quiz, extrusion, endurance, sleight). The Battle winner must win two duels. The Battle loser is evicted from the game.

== Finishing order ==
Ages stated are at time of contest.

Contestant	Age	Hometown	Entered	Exited	Status	Finish
Ann Gyllenhammar	55	Gällö	Day 1	Day 5	Left Competition; Day 5	18th
Louise Olsson	30	Krika	Day 1	Day 6	Ejected; Day 6	17th
Rocco Milovanović	63	Västerås	Day 1	Day 7	1st Evicted; Day 7	16th
Kirsi Pärssinen (Siri Savelius)	50	Västerås	Day 1	Day 14	2nd Evicted; Day 14	15th
Daniella Högström	20	Kinna	Day 1	Day 21	3rd Evicted; Day 21	14th
Gustav Anestam	28	Stockholm	Day 1	Day 28	4th Evicted; Day 28	13th
Mansoor Ashrati	23	Lund	Day 1	Day 34	Left Competition; Day 34	12th
Pawel Grimvi	35	Växjö	Day 1	Day 35	5th Evicted; Day 35	11th
Robert "Mulle" Dahlgren	51	Stockholm	Day 1	Day 42	6th Evicted; Day 42	10th
Linda Ekberg	31	Uddevalla	Day 12	Day 49	7th Evicted; Day 49	9th
Dee Omar	28	Stockholm	Day 1	Day 56	8th Evicted; Day 56	8th
Robin Johansen	30	Kaxås	Day 1 Day 57	Day 2 Day 63	9th Evicted; Day 63	7th
Stella Kibona	32	Malmö	Day 1	Day 63	10th Evicted; Day 63	6th
Robert Lundström	39	Kalmar	Day 12	Day 65	11th Evicted; Day 65	5th
Jean-Pierre Marques	31	Gothenburg	Day 1	Day 66	12th Evicted; Day 66	4th
Alexandra Louthander	26	Stockholm	Day 1	Day 67	13th Evicted; Day 67	3rd
Helena Hedqvist	24	Stallarholmen	Day 12; Day 57	Day 31; Day 68	Runner-up; Day 68	2nd
Stefan Eriksson	28	Fliseryd	Day 12	Day 68	Winner; Day 68	1st

== Sjöavikens ==
Starting in week three, former contestants are taken to Sjöavikens where they will live and compete until one of them wins the final dual and returns to the farm.

Contestant	Age	Hometown	Status	Finish
Daniella Högström	20	Kinna	Lost Dual; Day 22	8th
Rocco Milovanović	63	Västerås	Lost Dual; Day 29	7th
Kirsi Pärssinen	50	Västerås	Lost Dual; Day 32	6th
Gustav Anestam	28	Stockholm	Left Competition; Day 33	5th
Pawel Grimvi	35	Växjö	Lost Dual; Day 43	4th
Robert "Mulle" Dahlgren	51	Stockholm	Lost Dual; Day 57	3rd
Robin Johansen	30	Kaxås	Returned to Game; Day 57	1st/2nd
Helena Hedqvist	24	Stallarholmen	Returned to Game; Day 57	1st/2nd

== Sjöavikens duels ==
Week	1st Dueler	2nd Dueler	Evicted	Finish
4	Robin	Daniella	Daniella	Lost Dual; Day 22
5	Rocco	Gustav	Rocco	Lost Dual; Day 29
6	Kirsi	Helena	Kirsi	Lost Dual; Day 32
7	Pawel	Robert D	Pawel	Lost Dual; Day 43
9	Robin & Helena	Robert D	Robert D	Lost Dual; Day 57

== The game ==
Week	Farmer of the Week	1st Dueler	2nd Dueler	Evicted	Finish
1	Robert D	Mansoor	Rocco	Robin	Lost Challenge; Day 2
1	Robert D	Mansoor	Rocco	Ann	Left Competition; Day 5
1	Robert D	Mansoor	Rocco	Louise	Ejected; Day 6
1	Robert D	Mansoor	Rocco	Rocco	1st Evicted; Day 7
2	Stella	Kirsi	Alexandra	Kirsi	2nd Evicted; Day 14
3	Gustav	Stella	Daniella	Daniella	3rd Evicted; Day 21
4	Linda^{1}	Gustav	Robert D	Gustav	4th Evicted; Day 28
5	Dee	Pawel	Robert L	Helena	Lost Challenge; Day 31
5	Dee	Pawel	Robert L	Mansoor	Left Competition; Day 34
5	Dee	Pawel	Robert L	Pawel	5th Evicted; Day 35
6	Dee	Robert D	Robert L	Robert D	6th Evicted; Day 42
7	Alexandra	Dee	Linda	Linda	7th Evicted; Day 49
8	Robert L	Stefan	Dee	Dee	8th Evicted; Day 56
9	Robert L	Robin	Jean-Pierre	Robin	9th Evicted; Day 63
9	Robert L	Helena	Stella	Stella	10th Evicted; Day 63
10	None	Alexandra	Robert L	Robert L	11th Evicted; Day 65
10	None	All	All	Jean-Pierre	12th Evicted; Day 66
10	None	All	All	Alexandra	13th Evicted; Day 67
Final Duel				Helena	Runner-up; Day 68
Final Duel				Stefan	Winner; Day 68

Notes

^1 After Daniella lost the dual, she could only choose either Linda or Helena to become the Farmer of the Week. She chose Linda.
