= Shungumbili Island =

Protected private island and marine reserve in Pwani Region of Tanzania

- Location on the Mafia Archipelago

Geography
- Location: Sea of Zanj
- Coordinates: 7°42′0″S 39°40′58.8″E
- Archipelago: The Mafia Archipelago
- Length: 0.3 km (0.19 mi)
- Width: 0.2 km (0.12 mi)

Administration
- Tanzania
- Region: Pwani Region
- District: Mafia District
- Ward: Kirongwe

Demographics
- Languages: Swahili
- Ethnic groups: Matumbi, Ndengereko & Rufiji

Shungumbili Island or Shungi Mbili, also more commercially known as Thanda Island (Kisiwa cha Shungumbili, in Swahili) is a private island of the Mafia Archipelago located in Kirongwe ward of Mafia District in southern Pwani Region of Tanzania. The island is not a part of the Mafia Island Marine Park.

== Private island status ==
Dan Olofsson, a Swedish technology entrepreneur who runs the consultancy Sigma, became preoccupied with them. In order to construct a winter house somewhere warmer than their native Scandinavia, he and his wife Christin decided in the early 2000s. Despite considering the Caribbean, they ultimately decided to travel further south in South Africa.

Their original intentions expanded to incorporate a guest lodge, which debuted in 2004 at what is now the renowned Thanda Safari Private Game Reserve in South Africa. The Zulu word "thanda" means "love." Soon after, the Olofssons decided on a private island in southern Tanzania's Shungi Mbili Island Reserve as the private island counterpart to their safari lodge.

With their three children and eight grandkids, the Olofssons pictured the island as their own private paradise. However, the Tanzanian government prohibited them from purchasing it unless it helped to promoted luxury tourism and preserve marine life in the nation. Despite their commitment to constructing a private family house, the couple complied. It was renamed Thanda Island after years of negotiations with the Tanzanian government and environmentally conscious construction development consultants, and in August 2016 it received its first paying visitors.

The property is around 20 acres in size, surrounded by coral reefs, and is available for rent in its entirety for $10,000 per night (for up to ten people). The protected waters surrounding the property are teeming with aquatic life, including whale sharks, dolphins, and five different types of turtles. Mafia Island, the nearest populated area, is where you'll find more marine life, reliable dive shops, and traditional villages.

The island was created with self-sufficiency in mind. It is made of environmentally friendly natural materials, and there is a desalinization plant and a field of solar panels. The house was also constructed such that it could be disassembled and removed off the island with no traces left behind. Olofsson, who has made significant investments in conservation in the marine reserve, values that eco-awareness. Thanda is collaborating on research and conservation programmes involving sea turtles, whale sharks, and coral reefs with the Tanzania Marine Parks division and a reputable NGO, Sea Sense.
