= Lapp-Nils =

Swedish, Sámi composer

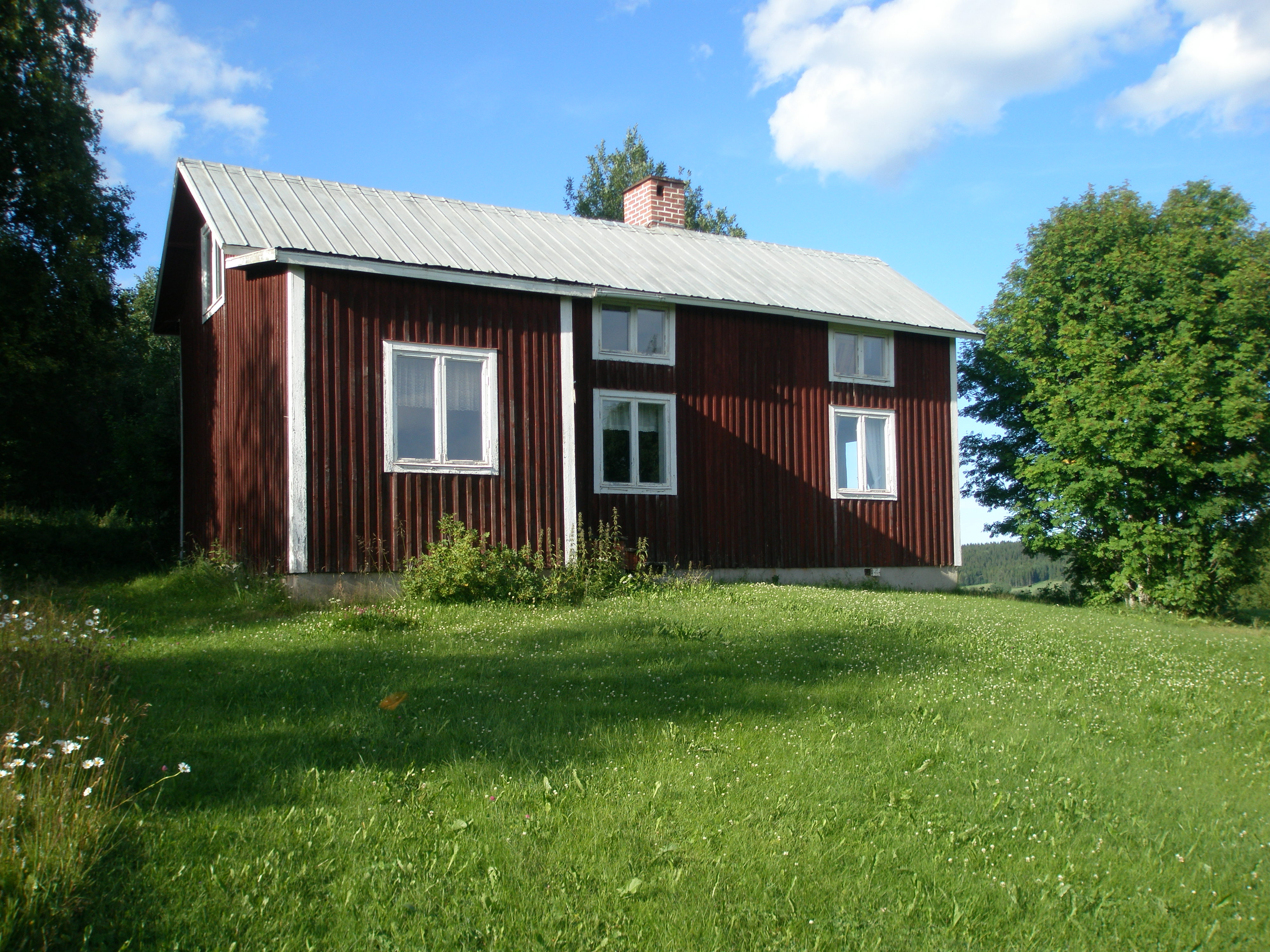
The home of Lapp-Nils in Önet, Offerdal

Lapp-Nils (Nils Jonsson) (8 May 1804 – 18 April 1870) was a Swedish and Sami musician living in Offerdal, Jämtland, Sweden. He was a violinist and composer of Swedish folk music (Polska).
