= Gärde =

Coordinates: 63°33′59″N 13°46′45″E

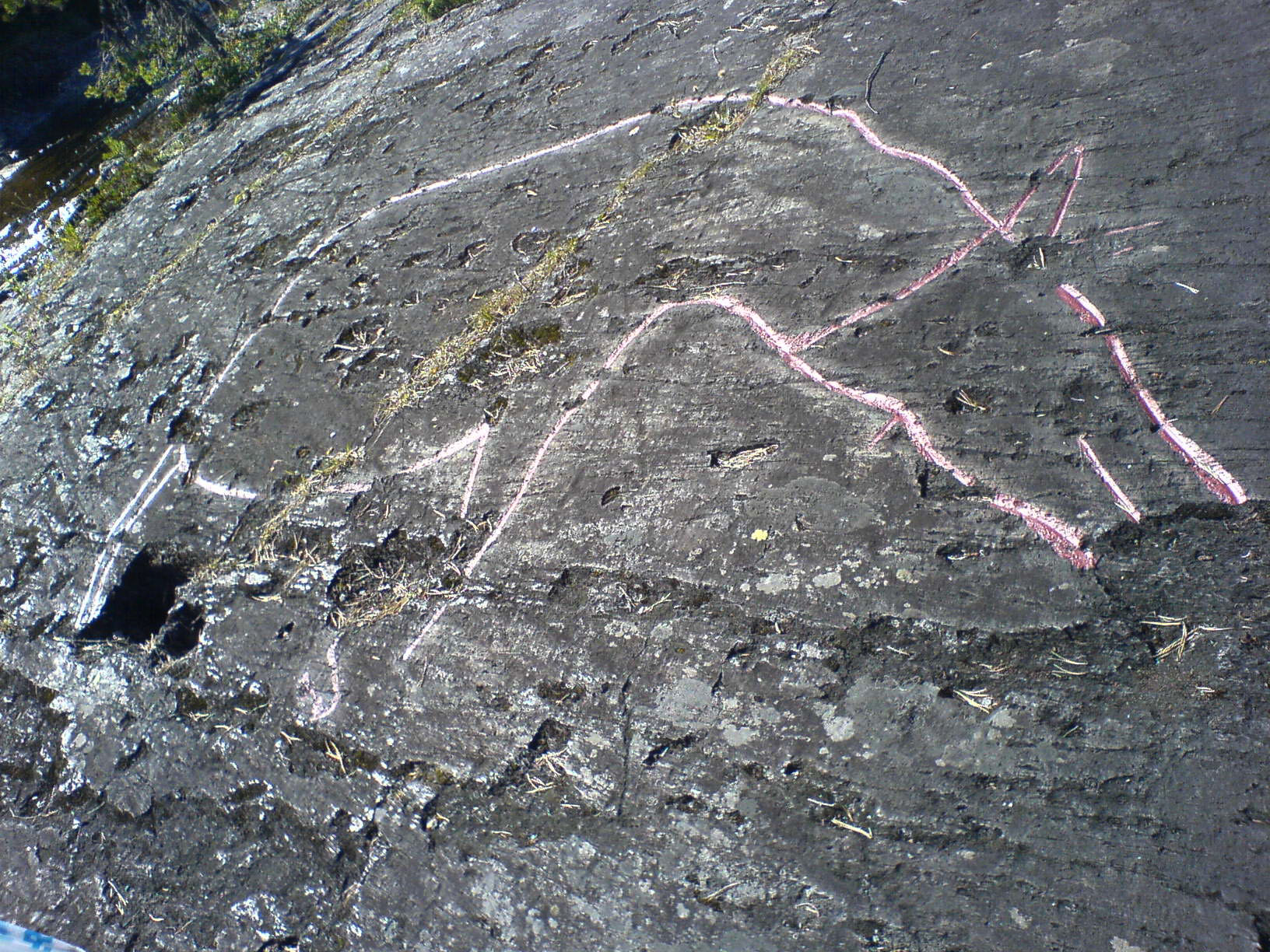
Petroglyphs at Gärdesån in Offerdal, Jämtland

Gärde is a locality in the north of Offerdal in the historical province Jämtland in the middle of Sweden. Gärde is situated in Krokom Municipality, 70 kilometres northwest of Östersund, the capital of Jämtland. Gärde is a traditional village in a genuine agricultural area with a long history. The name of the village has been known since 1553.

Petroglyphs on the river of Gärdesån in Gärde were made approximately 7 000 years ago. The carvings consist primely of moose and belong to the oldest petroglyphs in Sweden.

== Gallery ==
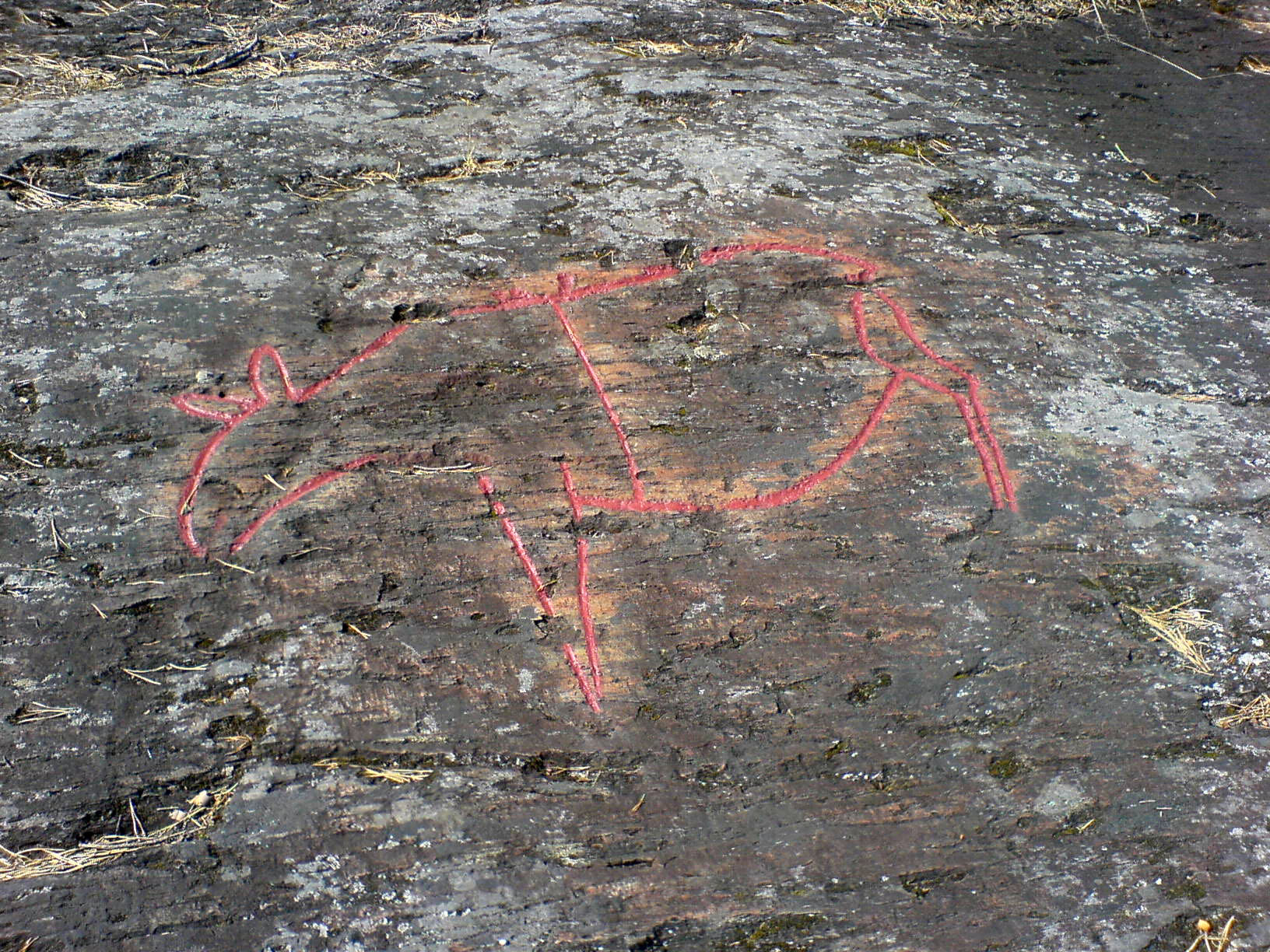

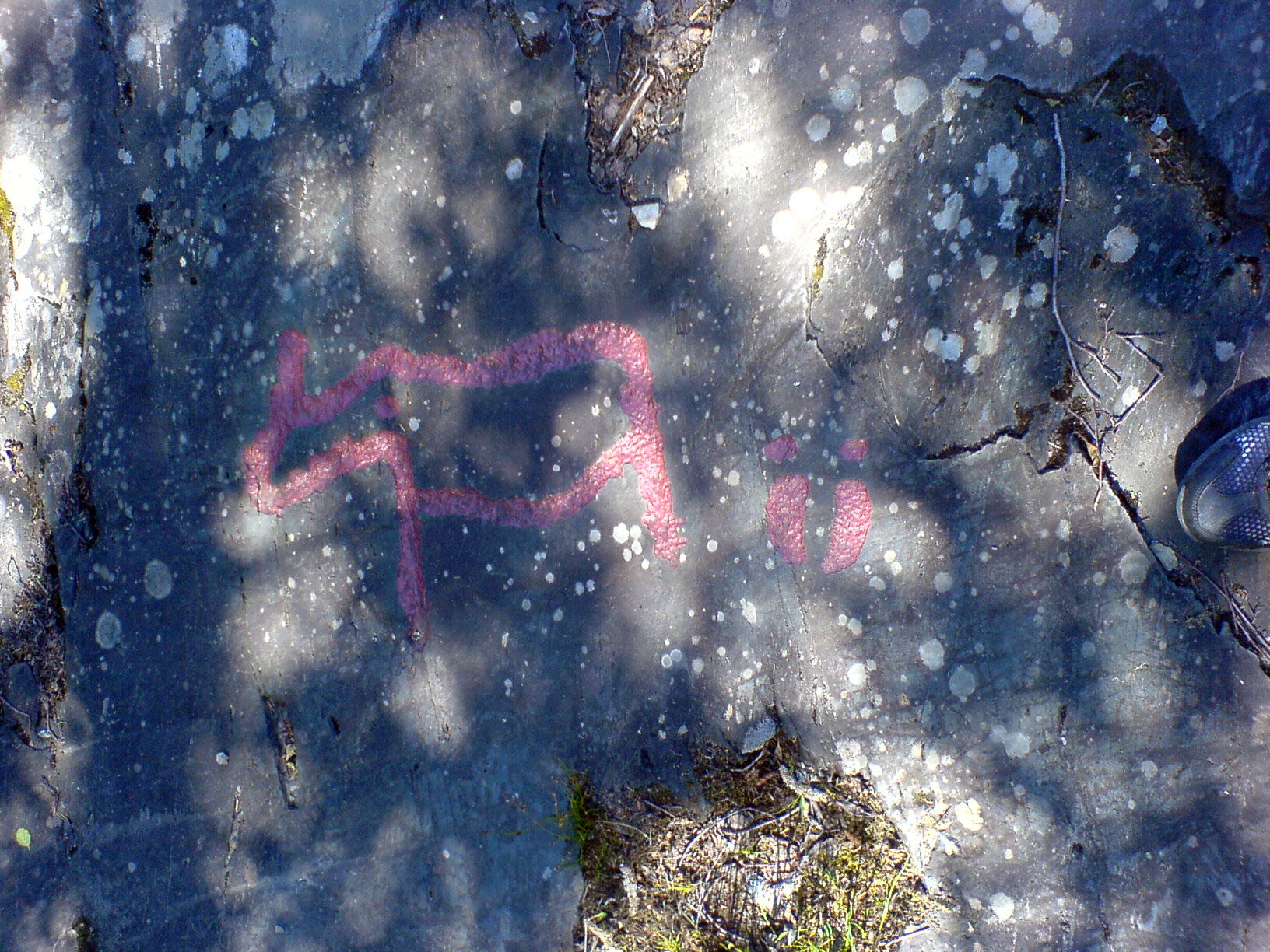

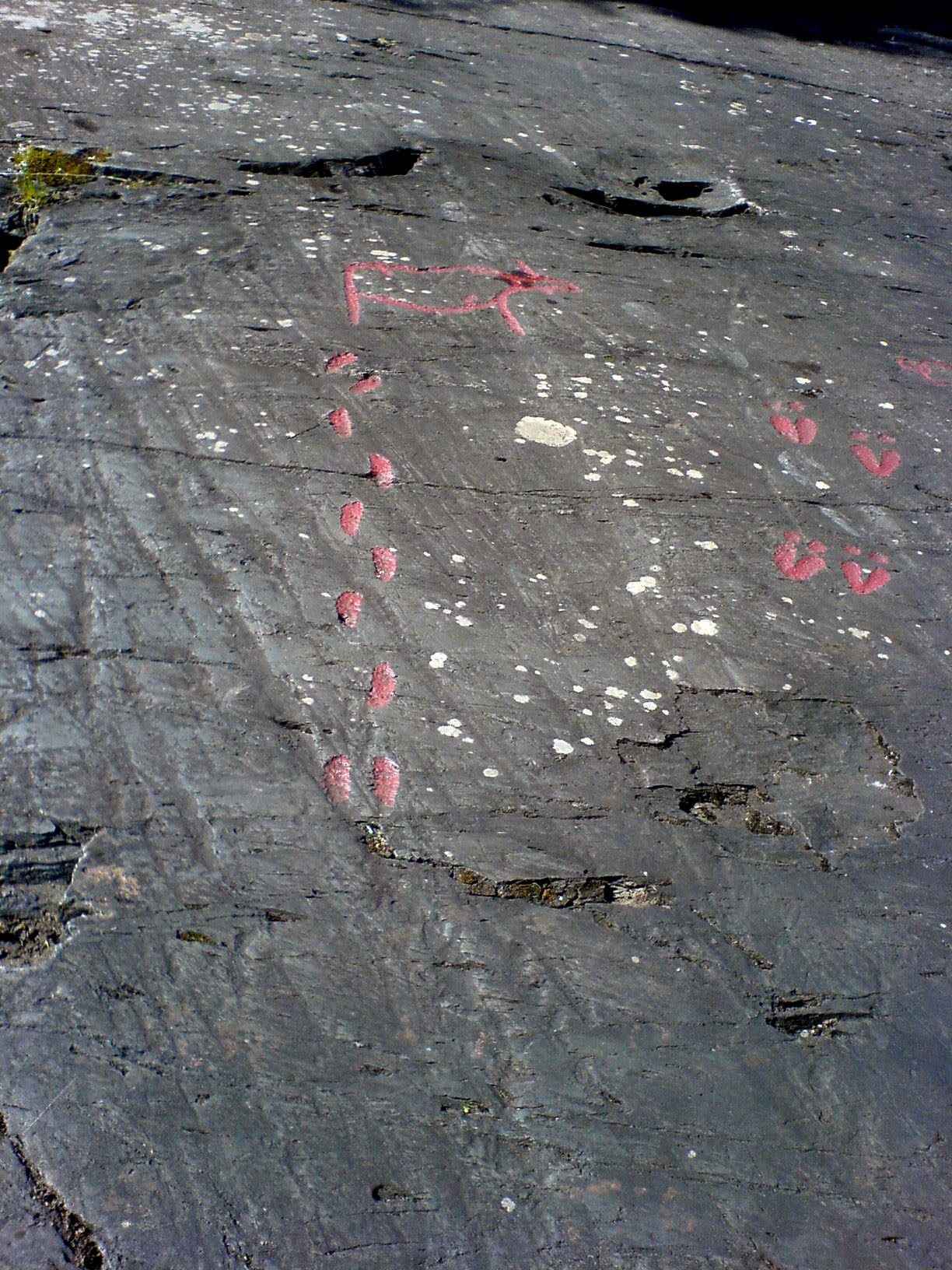
