= Änge =

- Locality
- Location within Jämtland Location within Sweden
- Coordinates: 63°27′30″N 14°04′10″E
- Country: Sweden
- Province: Jämtland
- County: Jämtland County
- Municipality: Krokom Municipality

Area
  - Total: 0.56 km^{2} (0.22 sq mi)

Population (31 December 2010)
  - Total: 314
  - Density: 563/km^{2} (1,460/sq mi)
- Time zone: UTC+1 (CET)
  - Summer (DST): UTC+2 (CEST)

Änge (from Old Norse engi 'meadow') is a locality situated in Krokom Municipality, Jämtland County, Sweden with 314 inhabitants in 2010. It is situated 50 kilometres northwest of Östersund, the capital of Jämtland. Änge was until 1974 the seat of the former municipality Offerdal.
