= Rönnöfors =

Coordinates: 63°39′N 13°50′E

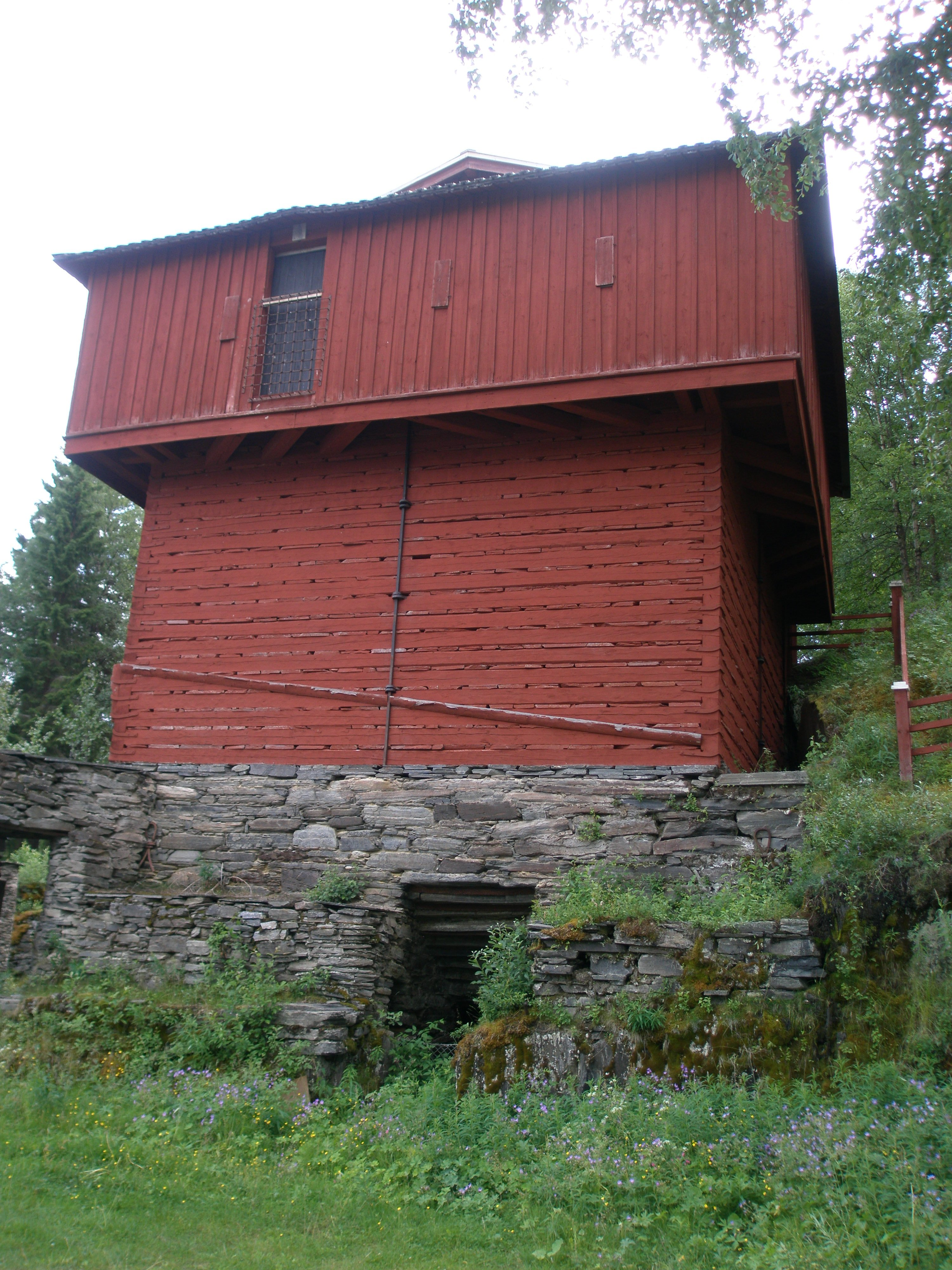
Iron manufacturing in Rönnöfors

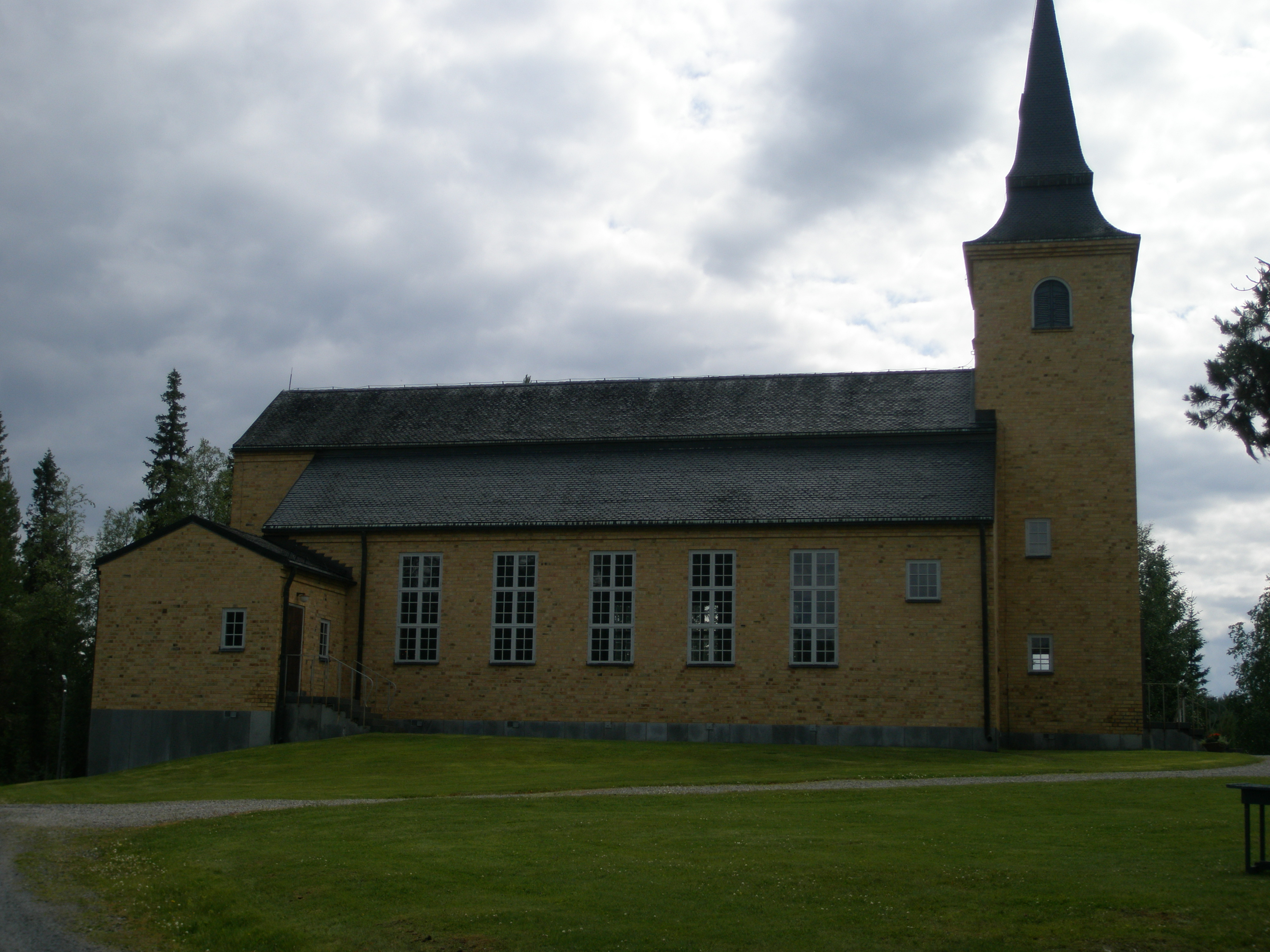
The Church of Rönnöfors

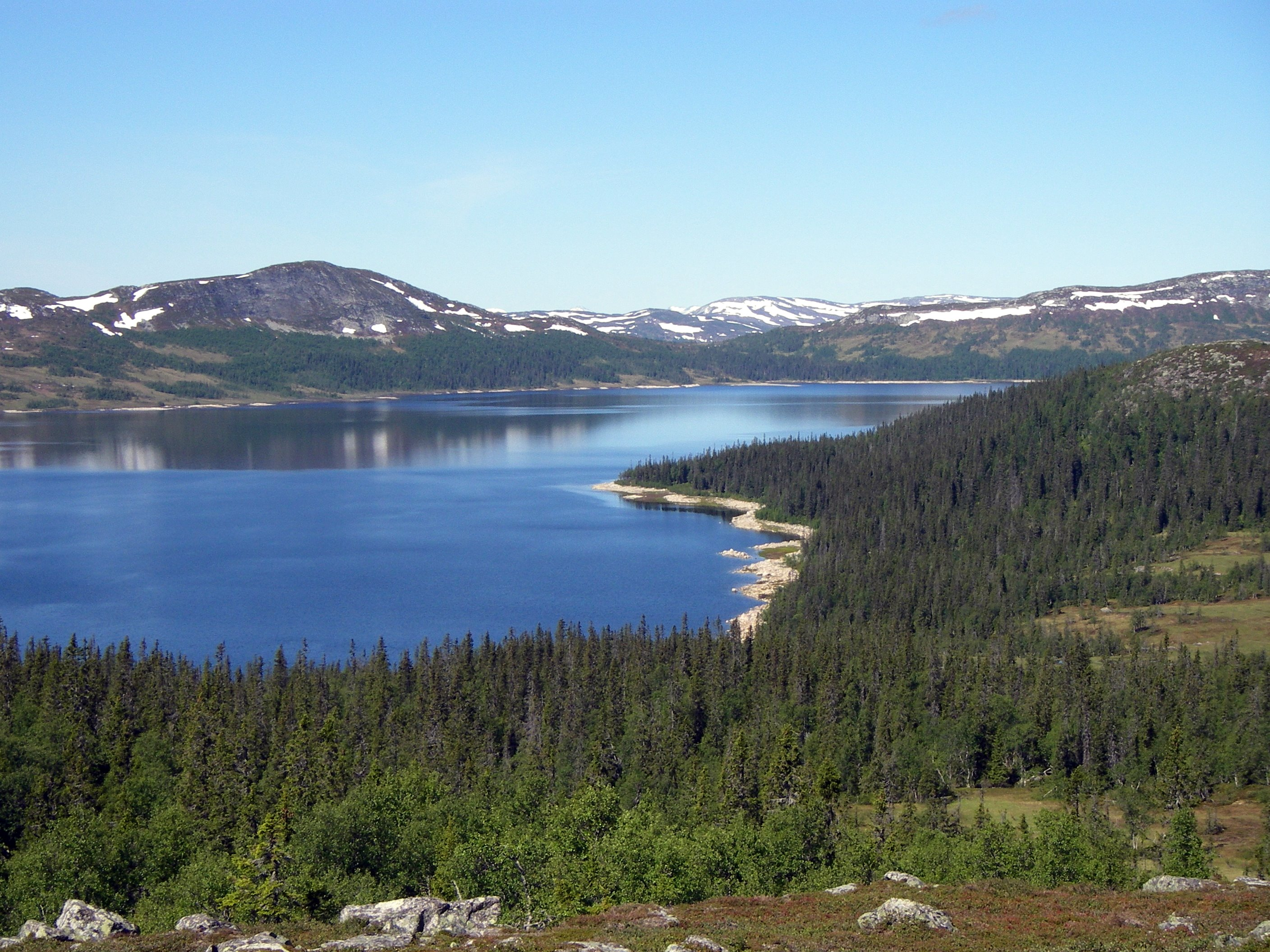
The mountains of Offerdal

Rönnöfors is a locality in the historical province Jämtland in the middle of Sweden. Rönnöfors is situated in Krokom Municipality, 80 kilometres northwest of Östersund, the capital of Jämtland.

Rönnöfors is situated in the north of Offerdal, near the Scandinavian Mountains. Some of the mountains are Oldklumpen, Ansätten, and Önrun. The Sami people have inhabited this part of Offerdal for at least 1000 years, in particular the villages Jänsmässholmen, Olden, and Frankrike. The Sami in Offerdal are Southern Sami people and speak Southern Sami.

In the 19th century there was a production of iron in Rönnöfors. Today quarrying activities of slate are concentrated to Rönnöfors (Offerdal slate).

The new church of Rönnöfors was built in 1954.
