= Star for Life =

Swedish non-profit school programme

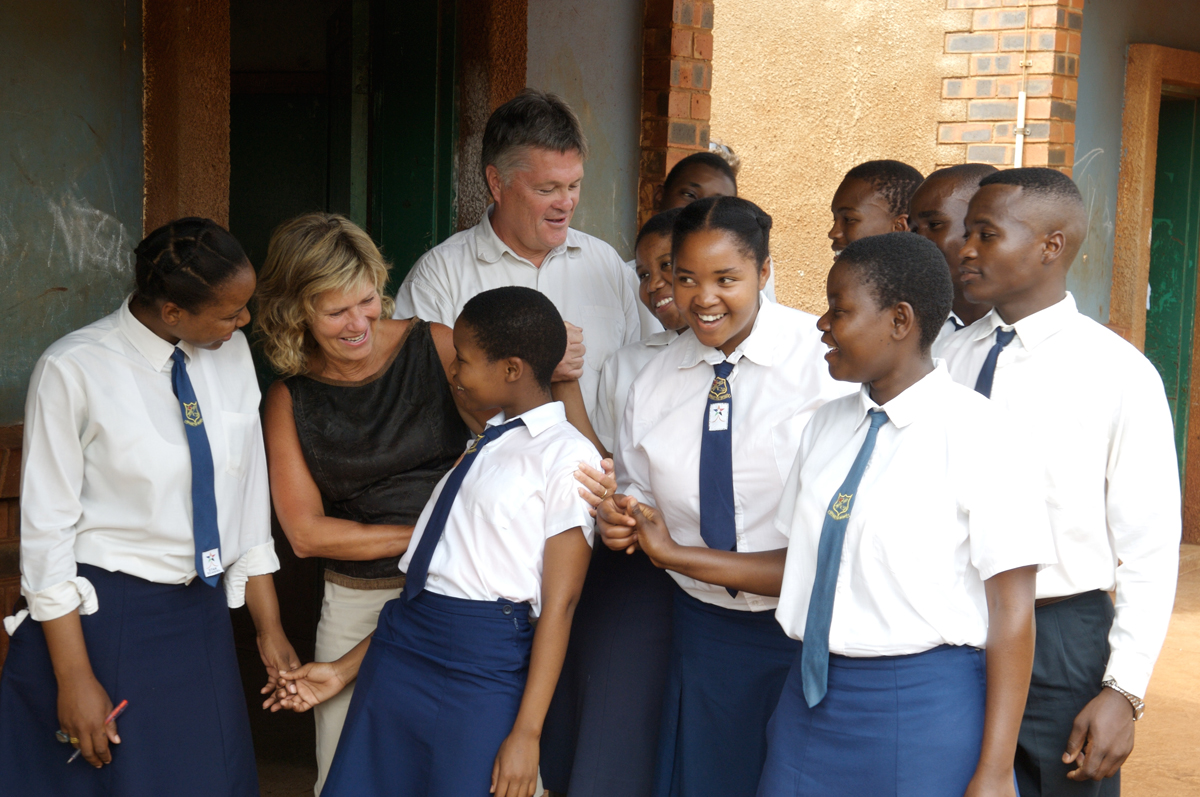
Dan Olofsson and his wife Christin talking to students at a Star for Life school

Star for Life (previously known as Star School) is a Swedish non-profit school programme that was created in Southern Africa to prevent HIV/AIDS from spreading. The idea was formed by the Swedish entrepreneur Dan Olofsson and his wife Christin. Their goal was to help young African people actualize their dreams and to support them to live an AIDS-free life by refraining from having unsafe sex.

Over 60,000 youths are educated in the prevention of HIV/AIDS by Star for Life in South Africa and Namibia. These youths are students at the 62 schools run by Star for Life there. The first school was started in the autumn of 2005 in the South African province KwaZulu-Natal. Olofsson paid for the expenses (15 million kronor) of this school by himself; the rest of the schools were paid for by sponsors. A fund was created for the programme and, as of 2008, 55 million kronor had been raised from donations by various Swedish company leaders such as Stefan Persson (H&M) and Volvo.

Alf Svensson, one of the people behind Star for Life, has commented on the advice given to youths by the programme: "It's either safe sex or no sex at all. The results have been fantastic. We have lowered the amount of teen pregnancies significantly."

The school programme lasts three years and uses colours, art, music, and sports as important parts of the education. They also work with strengthening the school children's self-esteem through coaching and support. Many South African youths have been given the opportunity to travel to Sweden to perform at concerts to raise money for the programme. These concerts help the youths to strengthen their esteem. The Swedish band Triple & Touch has done several concerts with African youths to support Star for Life. In addition to music, several football teams have been created in Africa.

Star for Life has received support from Mandla Mandela, Nelson Mandela's grandson, who helped raise money for the project when he came to Sweden in late 2009. The Star for Life logo appeared on the front of the professional football club Malmö FF's shirts during the 2009 Allsvenskan season.

Olofsson received a Global Business Coalition award in 2008 for Star for Life. Among the 700 guests at the award ceremony were Secretary-General of the United Nations Ban Ki-moon, who praised the programme.

Star for Life Germany is the independent arm of the Star for Life Foundation in Germany. Entrepreneur and philanthropist Dr Jörg Mosolf established Star for Life Germany as a charitable foundation in October 2021 to provide targeted coaching to students in disadvantaged regions of Southern Africa.

== Star for Life Ukraine ==
Star for Life Ukraine (SFLUA) is an independent Ukrainian charitable foundation established on 30 January 2023, in response to the full-scale Russian invasion of Ukraine. The organization was co-founded by Swedish entrepreneur and philanthropist Dan Olofsson and Valery Krasovsky, CEO of Sigma Software Group, with Dennis Wolowyk serving as Executive Director.

SFLUA operates as part of the Star for Life International network and focuses on IT education, psychosocial support, and humanitarian aid for children affected by the war. By 2025, the organization had established 11 technology laboratories across Ukraine and was serving over 22,000 students annually.

=== Government partnership ===
SFLUA has signed a memorandum of cooperation with the Ministry of Education and Science of Ukraine, formalizing collaboration to promote IT education and children's wellbeing across the country. The partnership supports the integration of programming education and mental health initiatives into Ukraine's broader educational framework.

=== Programs ===
SFLUA's programs address education, mental health, and humanitarian needs simultaneously. The Girls in Tech initiative, developed in collaboration with Street Child Foundation, works to increase girls' participation in technology education and challenge gender stereotypes in the IT sector. The Mental Boost program provides psychosocial support, helping students develop emotional resilience and wellbeing practices alongside technical skills. The Computer for Kid project has distributed nearly 300 computers to high-performing students across Ukraine.

=== National Programming Tournament ===
Since 2024, SFLUA has organized the Ukraine National Programming Tournament, an annual competition in which Ukrainian youth develop and present original IT projects evaluated by industry professionals from leading technology companies including Sigma Software, Nexer Group, and ELEKS. The tournament is held under the patronage of the Ministry of Education and Science of Ukraine and serves as one of the few national IT competitions for schoolchildren operating during the ongoing war.

=== Funding and recognition ===
In 2025, SFLUA received a major institutional grant from SIDA (Swedish International Development Cooperation Agency), reflecting international recognition of the organization's impact and crisis-response education model. In 2023, SFLUA received a Highly Commended award in the Best Charity or NGO Programme category at the Corporate Engagement Awards in London.

SFLUA is a member of Eurochild, the European network of organizations working for children's rights, which has described the organization's crisis-response education model as scalable and transferable beyond Ukraine. Partners include Nexer Group, Zacco, Voices of Children, Street Child Foundation, and ETH Zurich.
