= Dan Olofsson =

Swedish businessman

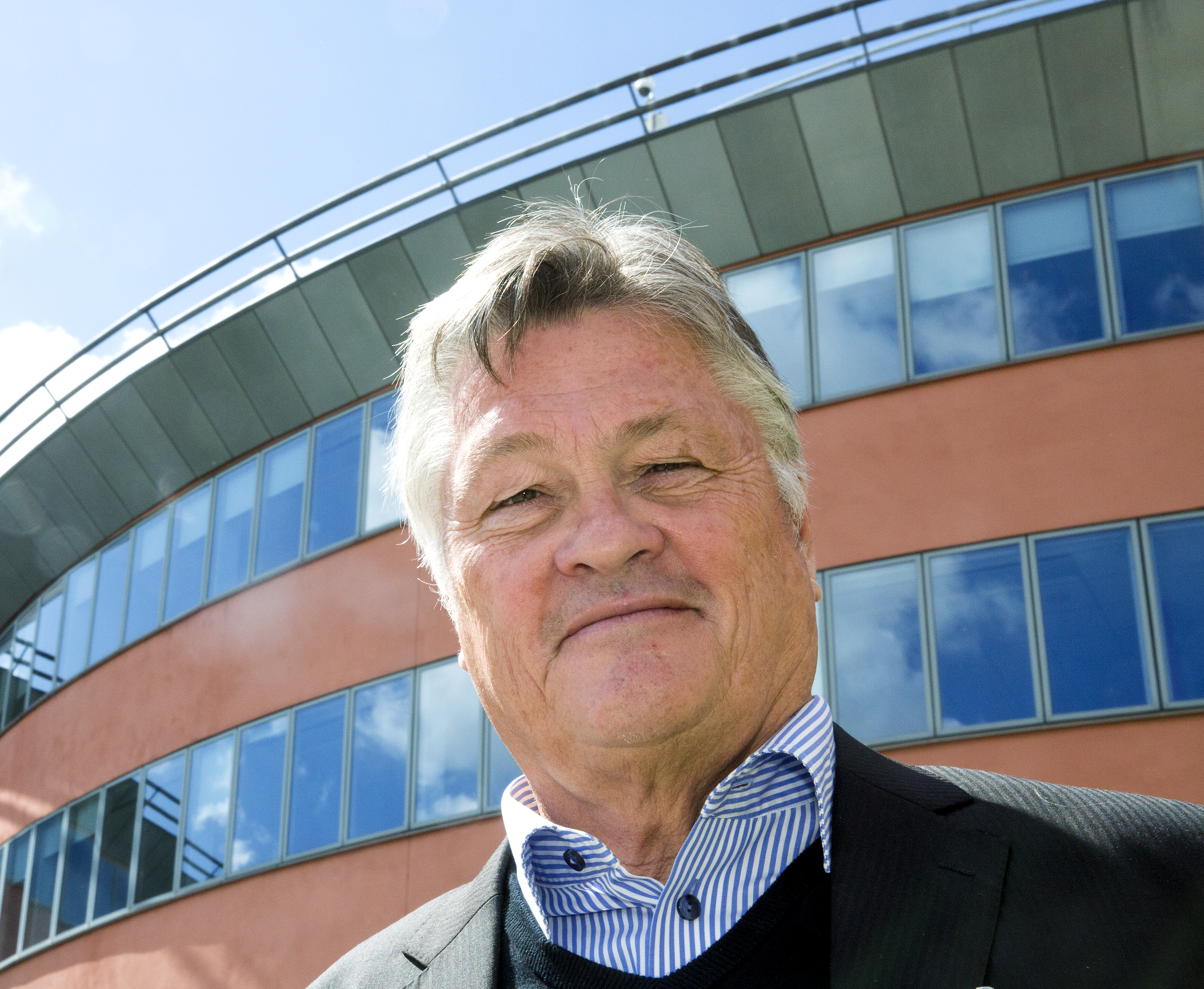
- Born: 24 September 1950 (age 76); Ekenäs, Finland
- Occupations: Entrepreneur, business leader and philanthropist
- Spouse: Christin (m. 1973)
- Children: Johan; Andreas; Hanna

Dan Olof Olofsson (born 24 September 1950 in Ekenäs, Finland) is a Swedish entrepreneur, business leader and philanthropist.

== Biography ==
Dan Olofsson was born as the second oldest of five siblings in Ekenäs, Finland, where his father was employed as pastor of Karis from 1948 to 1951. His parents and family are rooted in Kaxås, in Jämtland in northern Sweden. When Olofsson was one year old his family moved to Malmö in southern Sweden, where he was brought up and still lives.

Olofsson attended upper secondary technical school at Pauliskolan in Malmö and graduated as Master of Science in Engineering at Lunds Tekniska Högskola in 1974. After his education, Olofsson began a career in the technology consulting industry. He started at VBB (what is now Sweco) where he during 1979 became group manager for a new venture in energy technology. Later, Dan Olofsson proceeded to become region manager for Scandiaconsult's southern division.

=== The Danir Group ===
The family business Danir was founded in 1986. Dan Olofsson has gradually, together with his son Johan Glennmo and with a long-term focus, built this group of companies. In 2024, the group had 10,000 employees in 29 countries and generated a revenue of around SEK 13.5 billion. The Group has grown primarily through new hires and the start-up of new businesses.

The main business is consulting companies that focus on supporting customers in their digitalization. This is run within the framework of Sigma, Nexer, A Society, and PION Group. The Danir Group also has financial investments.

=== Thanda and Star for Life ===
In 2002, Dan Olofsson decided to build the safari facility Thanda Safari with more than 14,000 hectares of land in South Africa. The safari facility is a conservation project to protect endangered species and has also for several years received the World Travel Award as “The World's Leading Luxury Lodge”. In 2016, the luxury marine reserve Thanda Island opened just off the coast of Tanzania and was awarded “The World’s Leading Exclusive Private Island” by World Travel Awards. Thanda Island has been named "The World’s Leading Exclusive Private Island" by the World Travel Awards every year from 2016 to 2023. In 2024, Thanda entered into a partnership with the internationally renowned hotel group Jumeirah. As a result, the brands Jumeirah Thanda Safari and Jumeirah Thanda Island will be used moving forward.

Olofsson's philanthropic commitment is best seen through the organization Star for Life, which he and his wife Christin launched in 2005. So far, 500,000 young people has participated in a four-year preventive programme against HIV/AIDS, promoting a healthy way of life, in South Africa, Namibia, and Sri Lanka. Since 2013, Star for Life is also established in Sweden under the name ‘Motivationslyftet’, aiming to strengthen young people's self-esteem and belief in the future. In 2021, Star for Life was started in Jerusalem with a focus on improving the living conditions of the inhabitants of East Jerusalem through investments in education and jobs.

=== Uppstart Malmö and Project Kaxås ===
In 2011, Olofsson initiated the founding of "Uppstart Malmö", a trust aimed at creating more job opportunities in the under-privileged areas of his hometown Malmö. The concept behind the trust is to offer advice, support and financial help to local entrepreneurs who create more jobs, and to help young people and immigrants enter the labor market. Altogether, more than 3,500 people have found work through this initiative.

To break the depopulation in sparsely populated areas of Norrland's interior and ensure the survival of Kaxås village school, Project Kaxås was started in 2019. The idea was to invest in young families who want to live a safe life close to nature and still have access to a functioning labour market including teleworking. By moving in young families from different places in Sweden, the number of inhabitants in Kaxås increases from 100 to about 260, of which the number of children increases by over 60. The eco-village Ladriket is an important part of Project Kaxås.

=== Ukraine ===
In 2006, Dan Olofsson's Sigma acquired a majority stake in an IT consultancy with 60 employees in Kharkiv. The company, Sigma Software, has since grown to 2,000 employees, with offices in many of Ukraine's major cities and clients in the US, Europe, and Ukraine.

Since Russia's brutal invasion of Ukraine on 24 February 2022, Dan Olofsson and his companies have been deeply engaged in supporting Ukraine. Their efforts include direct aid to the army, support for civil society, strengthening Ukrainian exports, advocacy for Ukraine in Sweden, housing for Ukrainian refugees in Sweden, and the Star for Life programme for children in Ukraine, among other initiatives.

=== Miscellaneous ===
In the autumn of 2012, Olofsson's autobiography Mina tre liv (“My three lives”) was published by the publishing house Ekerlids Förlag. The book has received particular attention for its claim that the Swedish government should have committed a financial miscarriage of justice at financier Maths O Sundqvist.

In recent years, Olofsson has actively participated in the public debate on issues relating to business conditions and entrepreneurship, about the defense of freedom of choice in welfare, and about the need for a policy that combines a positive climate for companies with social responsibility.

== Bibliography ==
- My three lives: about enterprise, engagement and violation of justice. Stockholm: Ekerlid. Libris. ISBN 978-91-87391-18-7

== Awards ==
- 2001 – South Swedish county of Skåne's Greatest Entrepreneur
- 2004 – City of Malmö Ambassador of the Year
- 2008 – The Pegasus Prize
- 2008 – The Community Philanthropy Award at Global Business Coalition in New York
- 2011 – Entrepreneurial Role model of the Year by Founders Alliance
- 2011 – H.M. The King's Medal 12th size for important contributions to Swedish business and philanthropic commitment
- 2012 – The Royal Patriotic Society Business Medal for outstanding entrepreneurship
- 2012 – The magazine Veckans Affärer’s Social Capitalist Award, given to role models who through business try to solve problems in society
- 2015 – Olofsson was honored with the Swedish Region Skåne's award for exceptional efforts for the development of Skåne
- 2015 – Awarded an honorary doctorate by the Faculty of Technology and Society at Malmö University in Malmö, Sweden, for contributing to resolve societal problems through the use of information and communication technology
- 2015 – Awarded an honorary doctorate by the University of FASTA in Argentine, for his citizenship and philanthropic efforts in Africa and Sweden
- 2015 – Awarded The Confederation of Swedish Enterprise' (Swedish: Svenskt Näringsliv) Nicolin Prize for his contributions to the public debate for a better understanding of the importance of enterprises
- 2018 – Dan Olofsson is chosen to become a member of the Robert F. Kennedy Human Rights Leadership Council
- 2019 – Appointed 2019's Growth Entrepreneur in Malmö, Sweden
- 2021 – Jerusalem Mayor's Medal of Honor for long-term support of the Jewish nation and work to improve the living conditions of the residents of East Jerusalem.
- 2025 – Medal awarded by the Ukrainian army for significant support to the armed forces.
- 2025 – Medal awarded by the Ukrainian Orthodox Church for outstanding commitment to Ukraine.
