= Kaxås =

Coordinates: 63°29′N 13°55′E

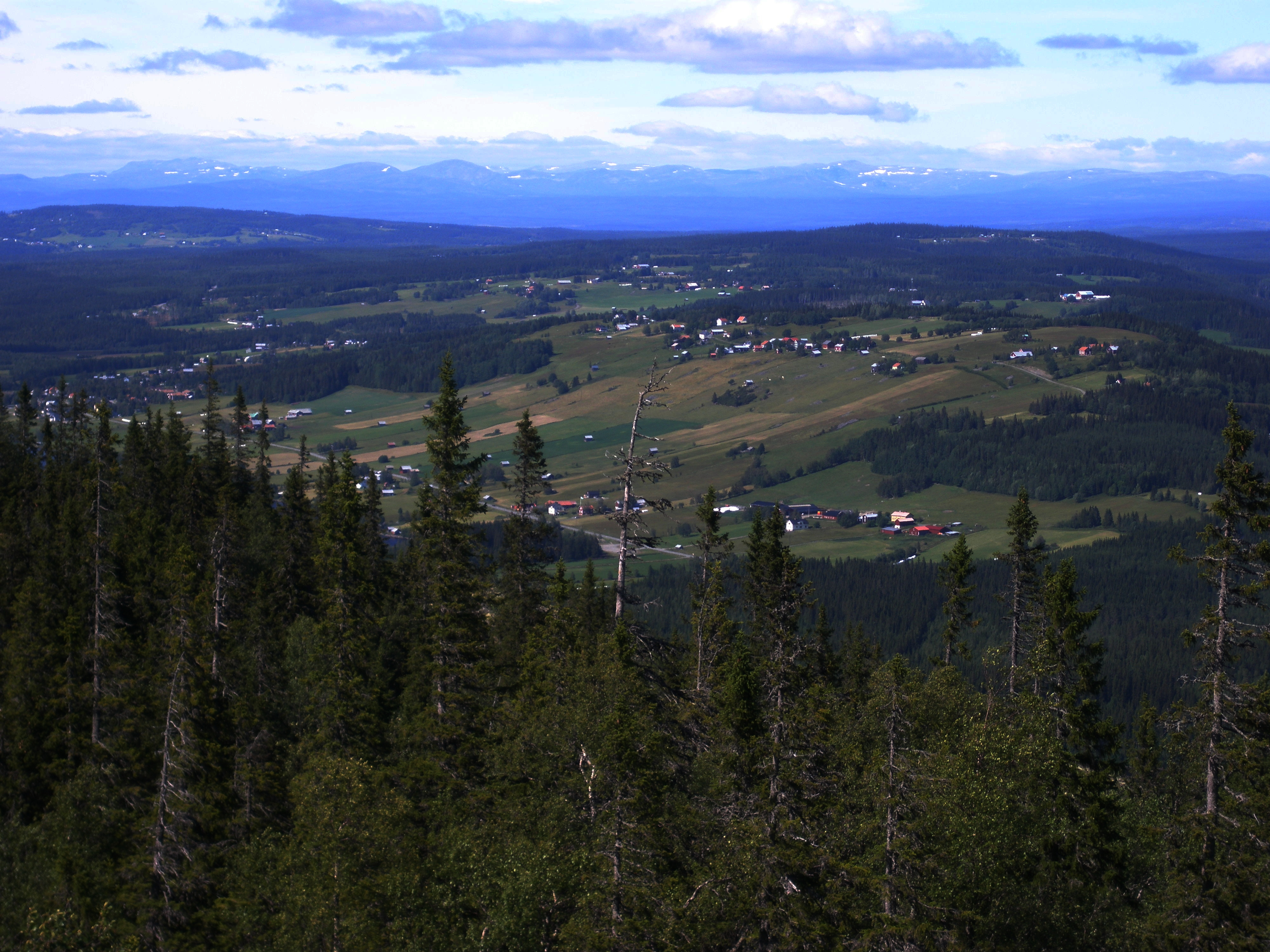
Kaxås in Offerdal

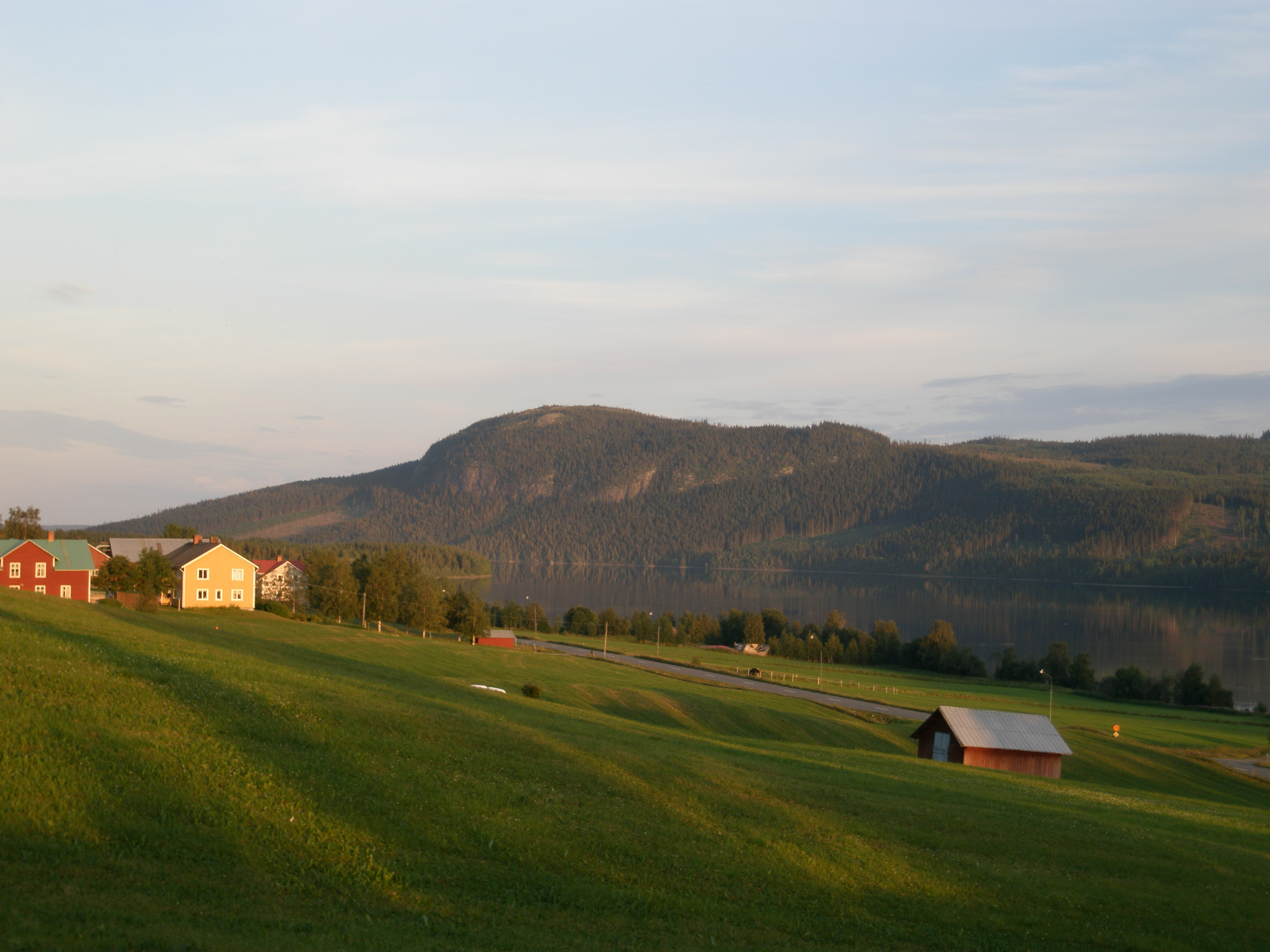
The mountain Hällberget in Offerdal

Kaxås is a locality in the historical province Jämtland in the middle of Sweden. Kaxås is situated in Offerdal in Krokom Municipality, 60 kilometres northwest of Östersund, the capital of Jämtland.

Kaxås is a traditional village in a genuine agricultural area. The village has a long history. One of the oldest ancient monuments in this part of Sweden, an 8 000 year old arrowhead (Offerdalsspetsen), was found in 1881 in Åflo nearby Kaxås.

The name of the village has been known since 1472. In the 19th century, Kaxås became an important village for this part of Offerdal.
