= August 28 =

August 28 this year in various calendars
- Friday, 28 August 2026
Akan	Nwonafie
Armenian	9 Hoṙi 1476
Aztec	Atemoztli 10, 10 Tecpatl
Babylonian	14 Abu, 2337 SE
Balinese pawukon	Luang, Pepet, Beteng, Menala, Paing, Aryang, Sukra of Matal, Uma, Tulus, Manuh
Bengali	13 Bhadro, BS 1433
Chinese	Yang Wood Dog・Ox Mansion; Fire Horse Year, Month 7, Day 16 (Chushu, 10 days until Bailu)
Common Era	28 August 2026 CE
Coptic	22 Mesori, AM 1742
Egyptian	14 Tybi, 2775 NE
Ethiopian	22 Naḥasē, 2018 Amätä Məhrät
French Republican	Décade II, Primidi de Fructidor de l'Année 234 de la République
Gregorian	28 August, AD 2026
Hebrew	15 Elul, AM 5786
Hindu	Śatabhiṣaj・Atigaṇḍa; Solar: 12 Bhādrapada, 1948 SE; Lunisolar: Pūrṇimā, Śukla pakṣa of Śrāvaṇa, 2083 VE; Rāudra・5127 KY・1,872,815
Icelandic	Föstudagur, 4 Tvímánuður 2026
Islamic	14 Rabi' al-awwal, AH 1448 (using tabular method)
ISO week date	2026-W35-5
Japanese	16 Fumizuki, Reiwa 8 (Shosho, 10 days until Hakuro)
Julian	15 August, AD 2026 (AM 7534)
Julian day	2461281
Korean	16 Wonsungidal, 4359 DE
Maya	13.0.13.15.18; 11 Mol, 10 Etznab
Roman	ante diem XVIII Kalendas Septembres, MMDCCLXXIX AUC
Solar Hijri	6 Shahrivar, SH 1405
Tibetan	15 gro bzhin, me pho rta 2153 or 1772 or 1000

<<	August					>>
Su	Mo	Tu	We	Th	Fr	Sa
						1
2	3	4	5	6	7	8
9	10	11	12	13	14	15
16	17	18	19	20	21	22
23	24	25	26	27	28	29
30	31
2026

August 28 in recent years
2026 (Friday)
2025 (Thursday)
2024 (Wednesday)
2023 (Monday)
2022 (Sunday)
2021 (Saturday)
2020 (Friday)
2019 (Wednesday)
2018 (Tuesday)
2017 (Monday)

August 28 is the 240th day of the year (241st in leap years) in the Gregorian calendar; 125 days remain until the end of the year.

== Events ==
=== Pre-1600 ===
- 475 – The Roman general Orestes forces western Roman Emperor Julius Nepos to flee his capital city, Ravenna.
- 489 – Theodoric, king of the Ostrogoths, defeats Odoacer at the Battle of Isonzo, forcing his way into Italy.
- 632 – Fatimah, daughter of the Islamic prophet Muhammad, dies, with her cause of death being a controversial topic among the Sunni Muslims and Shia Muslims.
- 663 – Silla–Tang armies crush the Baekje restoration attempt and force Yamato Japan to withdraw from Korea in the Battle of Baekgang.
- 1189 – Third Crusade: The Crusaders begin the Siege of Acre under Guy of Lusignan.
- 1290 – The second treaty of Birgham is ratified in which Margaret, Maid of Norway and granddaughter of king Alexander III of Scotland is to marry the English prince Edward of Caernarfon.
- 1521 – Ottoman wars in Europe: The Ottoman Turks occupy Belgrade.
- 1524 – The Kaqchikel Maya rebel against their former Spanish allies during the Spanish conquest of Guatemala.
- 1542 – Turkish–Portuguese War: Battle of Wofla: The Portuguese are scattered, their leader Christovão da Gama is captured and later executed.
- 1565 – Pedro Menéndez de Avilés sights land near St. Augustine, Florida and founds the oldest continuously occupied European-established city in the continental United States.

=== 1601–1900 ===
- 1609 – Henry Hudson discovers Delaware Bay.
- 1619 – Election of Ferdinand II, Holy Roman Emperor.
- 1640 – Second Bishop's War: King Charles I's English army loses to a Scottish Covenanter force at the Battle of Newburn.
- 1648 – Second English Civil War: The Siege of Colchester ends when Royalist Forces surrender to the Parliamentary Forces after eleven weeks.
- 1709 – Meidingnu Pamheiba is crowned King of Manipur.
- 1789 – William Herschel discovers a new moon of Saturn: Enceladus.
- 1810 – Napoleonic Wars: The French Navy accepts the surrender of a British Royal Navy fleet at the Battle of Grand Port.
- 1830 – The Baltimore and Ohio Railroad's new Tom Thumb steam locomotive races a horse-drawn car, presaging steam's role in U.S. railroads.
- 1833 – The Slavery Abolition Act 1833 receives royal assent, making the purchase or ownership of slaves illegal in the British Empire with exceptions.
- 1845 – The first issue of Scientific American magazine is published.
- 1849 – Revolutions of 1848 in the Austrian Empire: After a month-long siege, Venice, which had declared itself independent as the Republic of San Marco, surrenders to Austria.
- 1850 – Richard Wagner's Lohengrin premieres at the Staatskapelle Weimar.
- 1859 – The Carrington event is the strongest geomagnetic storm on record to strike the Earth. Electrical telegraph service is widely disrupted.
- 1861 – American Civil War: Union forces attack Cape Hatteras, North Carolina in the Battle of Hatteras Inlet Batteries which lasts for two days.
- 1862 – American Civil War: The Second Battle of Bull Run, also known as the Battle of Second Manassas, begins in Virginia. The battle ends on August 30 with another Union defeat.
- 1867 – The United States takes possession of the (at this point unoccupied) Midway Atoll.
- 1879 – Anglo-Zulu War: Cetshwayo, last king of the Zulus, is captured by the British.
- 1890 – The strongest storm in Finnish history kills at least three people.
- 1898 – Caleb Bradham's beverage "Brad's Drink" is renamed "Pepsi-Cola".

=== 1901–present ===
- 1901 – Silliman University is founded in the Philippines. It is the first American private school in the country.
- 1909 – A group of mid-level Greek Army officers launches the Goudi coup, seeking wide-ranging reforms.
- 1913 – Queen Wilhelmina opens the Peace Palace in The Hague.
- 1914 – World War I: The Royal Navy defeats the German fleet in the Battle of Heligoland Bight.
- 1916 – World War I: Germany declares war on Romania.
- 1916 – World War I: Italy declares war on Germany.
- 1917 – Ten suffragists, members of the Silent Sentinels, are arrested while picketing the White House in favor of women's suffrage in the United States.
- 1921 – Russian Civil War: The Red Army dissolves the Makhnovshchina after driving the Revolutionary Insurgent Army out of Ukraine.
- 1924 – The Georgian opposition stages the August Uprising against the Soviet Union.
- 1936 – Nazi Germany begins its mass arrests of Jehovah's Witnesses, who are interned in concentration camps.
- 1937 – Toyota Motors becomes an independent company.
- 1943 – Denmark in World War II: German authorities demand that Danish authorities crack down on acts of resistance. The next day, martial law is imposed on Denmark.
- 1944 – World War II: Marseille and Toulon are liberated.
- 1946 – The Workers' Party of North Korea, predecessor of the ruling Workers' Party of Korea, is founded at a congress held in Pyongyang, North Korea.
- 1955 – Black teenager Emmett Till is lynched in Mississippi for whistling at a white woman, galvanizing the nascent civil rights movement.
- 1957 – U.S. Senator Strom Thurmond begins a filibuster to prevent the United States Senate from voting on the Civil Rights Act of 1957; he stopped speaking 24 hours and 18 minutes later. This would remain the longest speech ever conducted by a single Senator until Cory Booker spoke for 25 hours and five minutes, beginning on March 31, 2025.
- 1963 – March on Washington for Jobs and Freedom: Rev. Dr. Martin Luther King Jr. gives his I Have a Dream speech.
- 1964 – The Philadelphia race riot begins.
- 1968 – Police and protesters clash during 1968 Democratic National Convention protests as protesters chant "The whole world is watching".
- 1973 – Norrmalmstorg robbery: Stockholm police secure the surrenders of hostage-takers Jan-Erik Olsson and Clark Olofsson, defusing the Norrmalmstorg hostage crisis. The behaviours of the hostages later give rise to the term Stockholm syndrome.
- 1988 – Ramstein air show disaster: Three aircraft of the Frecce Tricolori demonstration team collide and the wreckage falls into the crowd. Seventy are killed and 346 seriously injured.
- 1990 – Gulf War: Iraq declares Kuwait to be its newest province.
- 1990 – An F5 tornado strikes the Illinois cities of Plainfield and Joliet, killing 29 people.
- 1993 – NASA's Galileo probe performs a flyby of the asteroid 243 Ida. Astronomers later discover a moon, the first known asteroid moon, in pictures from the flyby and name it Dactyl.
- 1993 – Singaporean presidential election: Former Deputy Prime Minister Ong Teng Cheong is elected President of Singapore. Although it is the first presidential election to be determined by popular vote, the allowed candidates consist only of Ong and a reluctant whom the government had asked to run to confer upon the election the semblance of an opposition.
- 1993 – The autonomous Croatian Community of Herzeg-Bosnia in Bosnia and Herzegovina is transformed into the Croatian Republic of Herzeg-Bosnia.
- 1993 – A Tajikistan Airlines Yakovlev Yak-40 crashes during takeoff from Khorog Airport in Tajikistan, killing 82.
- 1996 – Chicago Seven defendant David Dellinger, antiwar activist Bradford Lyttle, Civil Rights Movement historian Randy Kryn, and eight others are arrested by the Federal Protective Service while protesting in a demonstration at the Kluczynski Federal Building in downtown Chicago during that year's Democratic National Convention.
- 1998 – Pakistan's National Assembly passes a constitutional amendment to make the "Qur'an and Sunnah" the "supreme law" but the bill is defeated in the Senate.
- 1998 – Second Congo War: Loyalist troops backed by Angolan and Zimbabwean forces repulse the RCD and Rwandan offensive on Kinshasa.
- 1999 – The Russian space mission Soyuz TM-29 reaches completion, ending nearly 10 years of continuous occupation on the space station Mir as it approaches the end of its life.
- 2003 – In "one of the most complicated and bizarre crimes in the annals of the FBI", Brian Wells dies after becoming involved in a complex plot involving a bank robbery, a scavenger hunt, and a homemade explosive device.
- 2009 – NASA's Space Shuttle Discovery launches on STS-128.
- 2016 – The first experimental mission of ISRO's Scramjet Engine towards the realisation of an Air Breathing Propulsion System is successfully conducted from Satish Dhawan Space Centre SHAR, Sriharikota.
- 2017 – China–India border standoff: China and India both pull their troops out of Doklam, putting an end to a two-month-long stalemate over China's construction of a road in disputed territory.
- 2022 – Phoenix shooting: A man opens fire on pedestrians outside of a hotel in Phoenix, Arizona, resulting in the deaths of three people, including the perpetrator.

== Births ==
=== Pre-1600 ===
- 1023 – Go-Reizei, emperor of Japan (died 1068)
- 1366 – Jean Le Maingre, marshal of France (died 1421)
- 1476 – Kanō Motonobu, Japanese painter (died 1559)
- 1481 – Francisco de Sá de Miranda, Portuguese poet (died 1558)
- 1582 – Taichang, emperor of China (died 1620)
- 1591 – John Christian of Brieg, duke of Brzeg (died 1639)
- 1592 – George Villiers, 1st Duke of Buckingham, English courtier and politician (died 1628)

=== 1601–1900 ===
- 1612 – Marcus Zuerius van Boxhorn, Dutch linguist and scholar (died 1653)
- 1667 – Louise of Mecklenburg-Güstrow, queen of Denmark and Norway (died 1721)
- 1691 – Elisabeth Christine of Brunswick-Wolfenbüttel, Holy Roman Empress (died 1750)
- 1714 – Anthony Ulrich, duke of Brunswick-Lüneburg (died 1774)
- 1728 – John Stark, American general (died 1822)
- 1739 – Agostino Accorimboni, Italian composer (died 1818)
- 1740 – John Lynch, American city founder and abolitionist (died 1820)
- 1749 – Johann Wolfgang von Goethe, German novelist, poet, playwright, and diplomat (died 1832)
- 1774 – Elizabeth Ann Seton, American nun and saint, co-founded the Sisters of Charity Federation in the Vincentian-Setonian Tradition (died 1821)
- 1801 – Antoine Augustin Cournot, French mathematician and philosopher (died 1877)
- 1814 – Sheridan Le Fanu, Irish author (died 1873)
- 1816 – Charles Sladen, English-Australian politician, 6th Premier of Victoria (died 1884)
- 1822 – Graham Berry, English-Australian politician, 11th Premier of Victoria (died 1904)
- 1827 – Catherine Mikhailovna, Russian grand duchess (died 1894)
- 1833 – Edward Burne-Jones, English artist of the Pre-Raphaelite movement (died 1898)
- 1837 – Francis von Hohenstein, duke of Teck (died 1900)
- 1840 – Alexander Cameron Sim, Scottish-Japanese pharmacist and businessman, founded Kobe Regatta & Athletic Club (died 1900)
- 1841 – Louis Le Prince, French artist and original inventor of the motion picture camera (disappeared 1890)
- 1853 – Vladimir Shukhov, Russian architect and engineer, designed the Adziogol Lighthouse (died 1939)
- 1859 – Matilda Howell, American archer (died 1938)
- 1859 – Vittorio Sella, Italian mountaineer and photographer (died 1943)
- 1867 – Umberto Giordano, Italian composer and academic (died 1948)
- 1878 – George Whipple, American physician and pathologist, Nobel Prize laureate (died 1976)
- 1884 – Peter Fraser, Scottish-New Zealand journalist and politician, 24th Prime Minister of New Zealand (died 1950)
- 1885 – Vance Palmer, Australian author, playwright, and critic (died 1959)
- 1887 – August Kippasto, Estonian-Australian wrestler and poet (died 1973)
- 1887 – István Kühár, Slovenian priest and politician (died 1922)
- 1888 – Evadne Price, Australian actress, astrologer, and author (died 1985)
- 1891 – Benno Schotz, Estonian-Scottish sculptor and engineer (died 1984)
- 1893 – Val Imm, American politician and newspaper editor (died 1981)
- 1894 – Karl Böhm, Austrian conductor and director (died 1981)
- 1896 – Firaq Gorakhpuri, Indian author, poet, and critic (died 1982)
- 1896 – Leon Theremin, Russian-Soviet electronic musical instruments inventor (died 1993)
- 1898 – Charlie Grimm, American baseball player, manager, and sportscaster (died 1983)
- 1899 – Charles Boyer, French-American actor, singer, and producer (died 1978)
- 1899 – Andrei Platonov, Russian author and poet (died 1951)
- 1899 – James Wong Howe, Chinese American cinematographer (died 1976)

=== 1901–present ===
- 1903 – Bruno Bettelheim, Austrian-American psychologist and author (died 1990)
- 1904 – Secondo Campini, Italian-American engineer (died 1980)
- 1904 – Leho Laurine, Estonian chess player (died 1998)
- 1905 – Cyril Walters, Welsh-English cricketer (died 1992)
- 1906 – John Betjeman, English poet and academic (died 1984)
- 1908 – Roger Tory Peterson, American ornithologist and author (died 1996)
- 1910 – Morris Graves, American painter and academic (died 2001)
- 1910 – Tjalling Koopmans, Dutch-American mathematician and economist Nobel Prize laureate (died 1985)
- 1911 – Joseph Luns, Dutch politician and diplomat, 5th Secretary General of NATO (died 2002)
- 1913 – Robertson Davies, Canadian journalist, author, and playwright (died 1995)
- 1913 – Jack Dreyfus, American businessman, founded the Dreyfus Corporation (died 2009)
- 1913 – Lindsay Hassett, Australian cricketer and sportscaster (died 1993)
- 1913 – Robert Irving, English conductor and director (died 1991)
- 1913 – Terence Reese, English bridge player and author (died 1996)
- 1913 – Richard Tucker, American tenor and actor (died 1975)
- 1915 – Max Robertson, Bengal-born English sportscaster and author (died 2009)
- 1915 – Tasha Tudor, American author and illustrator (died 2008)
- 1916 – Hélène Baillargeon, Canadian singer and actress (died 1997)
- 1916 – C. Wright Mills American sociologist and author (died 1962)
- 1916 – Jack Vance, American author (died 2013)
- 1917 – Jack Kirby, Comic Book Artist and Writer (died 1994)
- 1918 – L. B. Cole, American illustrator and publisher (died 1995)
- 1919 – Godfrey Hounsfield, English biophysicist and engineer Nobel Prize laureate (died 2004)
- 1921 – John Herbert Chapman, Canadian physicist and engineer (died 1979)
- 1921 – Fernando Fernán Gómez, Spanish actor, director, and playwright (died 2007)
- 1921 – Nancy Kulp, American actress and soldier (died 1991)
- 1921 – Lidia Gueiler Tejada, the first female President of Bolivia (died 2011)
- 1924 – Janet Frame, New Zealand novelist Who Explored Madness (died 2004)
- 1924 – Tony MacGibbon, New Zealand cricketer and engineer (died 2010)
- 1924 – Peggy Ryan, American actress and dancer (died 2004)
- 1924 – Zalman Schachter-Shalomi, Ukrainian-American rabbi and author (died 2014)
- 1925 – Billy Grammer, American singer-songwriter and guitarist (died 2011)
- 1925 – Donald O'Connor, American actor, singer, and dancer (died 2003)
- 1925 – Philip Purser, English author and critic (died 2022)
- 1928 – F. William Free, American businessman (died 2003)
- 1928 – Vilayat Khan, Indian sitar player and composer (died 2004)
- 1929 – István Kertész, Hungarian conductor (died 1973)
- 1929 – Roxie Roker, American actress (died 1995)
- 1930 – Windsor Davies, British actor (died 2019)
- 1930 – Ben Gazzara, American actor (died 2012)
- 1931 – Tito Capobianco, Argentinian director and producer (died 2018)
- 1931 – Cristina Deutekom, Dutch soprano and actress (died 2014)
- 1931 – Ola L. Mize, American colonel, Medal of Honor recipient (died 2014)
- 1931 – John Shirley-Quirk, English actor, singer, and educator (died 2014)
- 1931 – Roger Williams, English hepatologist and academic (died 2020)
- 1932 – Yakir Aharonov, Israeli academic and educator
- 1932 – Andy Bathgate, Canadian ice hockey player, coach, and manager (died 2016)
- 1933 – Philip French, English journalist, critic, and producer (died 2015)
- 1933 – Patrick Kalilombe, Malawian bishop and theologian (died 2012)
- 1935 – Melvin Charney, Canadian sculptor and architect (died 2012)
- 1935 – Gilles Rocheleau, Canadian businessman and politician (died 1998)
- 1936 – Don Denkinger, American baseball player and umpire (died 2023)
- 1936 – Warren M. Washington, American atmospheric scientist
- 1938 – Maurizio Costanzo, Italian journalist and academic (died 2023)
- 1938 – Bengt Fahlström, Swedish journalist (died 2017)
- 1938 – Marcello Gandini, Italian automotive designer (died 2024)
- 1938 – Paul Martin, Canadian lawyer and politician, 21st Prime Minister of Canada
- 1939 – John Kingman, English mathematician and academic
- 1939 – Catherine Mackin, American newswoman, 1st to regularly anchor evening network newscast alone (died 1982)
- 1940 – William Cohen, American lawyer and politician, 20th United States Secretary of Defense
- 1940 – Roger Pingeon, French cyclist (died 2017)
- 1941 – Michael Craig-Martin, Irish painter and illustrator
- 1941 – Toomas Leius, Estonian tennis player and coach
- 1941 – John Stanley Marshall, English drummer (died 2023)
- 1941 – Paul Plishka, American opera singer
- 1942 – Wendy Davies, Welsh historian and academic
- 1942 – Jorge Urosa, Venezuelan cardinal (died 2021)
- 1943 – Jihad Al-Atrash, Lebanese actor and voice actor
- 1943 – Surayud Chulanont, Thai general and politician, 24th Prime Minister of Thailand
- 1943 – Robert Greenwald, American director and producer
- 1943 – Shuja Khanzada, Pakistani colonel and politician (died 2015)
- 1944 – Marianne Heemskerk, Dutch swimmer
- 1945 – Bob Segarini, American-Canadian singer-songwriter (died 2023)
- 1947 – Emlyn Hughes, English footballer (died 2004)
- 1947 – Liza Wang, Hong Kong actress and singer
- 1948 – Vonda N. McIntyre, American author (died 2019)
- 1948 – Murray Parker, New Zealand cricketer and educator
- 1948 – Heather Reisman, Canadian publisher and businesswoman
- 1948 – Danny Seraphine, American drummer and producer
- 1948 – Elizabeth Wilmshurst, English academic and jurist
- 1949 – Hugh Cornwell, English singer-songwriter and guitarist
- 1949 – Svetislav Pešić, Serbian basketball player and coach
- 1950 – Ron Guidry, American baseball player and coach
- 1950 – Tony Husband, English cartoonist (died 2023)
- 1951 – Colin McAdam, Scottish footballer (died 2013)
- 1951 – Wayne Osmond, American singer-songwriter and actor (died 2025)
- 1951 – Keiichi Suzuki, Japanese singer-songwriter
- 1952 – Jacques Chagnon, Canadian educator and politician
- 1952 – Rita Dove, American poet and essayist
- 1952 – Wendelin Wiedeking, German businessman
- 1953 – Ditmar Jakobs, German footballer
- 1953 – Tõnu Kaljuste, Estonian conductor and journalist
- 1954 – Katharine Abraham, American feminist economist
- 1954 – George M. Church, American geneticist, chemist, and engineer
- 1954 – John Dorahy, Australian rugby player and coach
- 1954 – Ravi Kanbur, Indian-English economist and academic
- 1956 – Luis Guzmán, Puerto Rican actor
- 1956 – John Long, American basketball player
- 1956 – Steve Whiteman, American singer-songwriter
- 1957 – Ai Weiwei, Chinese contemporary artist, documentarian, and activist
- 1957 – Greg Clark, English businessman and politician, Secretary of State for Communities and Local Government
- 1957 – Ivo Josipović, Croatian lawyer, jurist, and politician, 3rd President of Croatia
- 1959 – Brian Thompson, American actor, director, producer, and screenwriter
- 1961 – Kim Appleby, English singer-songwriter and actress
- 1961 – Cliff Benson, American football player
- 1961 – Ian Pont, English cricketer and coach
- 1961 – Deepak Tijori, Indian actor and director
- 1962 – Paul Allen, English footballer
- 1962 – Craig Anton, American actor and screenwriter
- 1962 – David Fincher, American director and producer
- 1963 – Maria Gheorghiu, Romanian folk singer-songwriter
- 1963 – Regina Jacobs, American runner
- 1964 – Lee Janzen, American golfer
- 1964 – Kaj Leo Johannesen, Faroese footballer and politician, 12th Prime Minister of the Faroe Islands
- 1965 – Dan Crowley, Australian rugby player
- 1965 – Satoshi Tajiri, Japanese video game developer; created Pokémon
- 1965 – Shania Twain, Grammy Award-winning Canadian Country Singer-Songwriter
- 1967 – Jamie Osborne, English jockey and trainer
- 1969 – Pierre Turgeon, Canadian-American ice hockey player
- 1971 – Shane Andrews, American baseball player
- 1971 – Raúl Márquez, Mexican-American boxer and sportscaster
- 1972 – Ravindu Shah, Kenyan cricketer
- 1972 – Jay Witasick, American baseball player and coach
- 1973 – Kirby Morrow, Canadian actor, comedian, and writer (died 2020)
- 1974 – Johan Andersson, Swedish game designer and programmer
- 1974 – Takahito Eguchi, Japanese pianist and composer
- 1974 – Carsten Jancker, German footballer and manager
- 1975 – Jamie Cureton, English footballer
- 1975 – Gareth Farrelly, Irish footballer and manager
- 1975 – Hamish McLachlan, Australian television personality
- 1975 – Royce Willis, New Zealand rugby player
- 1976 – Federico Magallanes, Uruguayan footballer
- 1978 – Karine Turcotte, Canadian weightlifter
- 1979 – Shaila Dúrcal, Spanish singer-songwriter
- 1979 – Robert Hoyzer, German footballer and referee
- 1979 – Kristen Hughes, Australian netball player
- 1979 – Markus Pröll, German footballer
- 1979 – Ruth Riley, American basketball player
- 1980 – Antony Hämäläinen, Finnish singer-songwriter
- 1980 – Debra Lafave, American sex offender and former teacher
- 1980 – Ryan Madson, American baseball player
- 1980 – Jaakko Ojaniemi, Finnish decathlete
- 1980 – Jonathan Reynolds, English lawyer and politician
- 1981 – Kezia Dugdale, Scottish politician
- 1981 – Daniel Gygax, Swiss footballer
- 1981 – Raphael Matos, Brazilian race car driver
- 1981 – Ahmed Talbi, Moroccan footballer
- 1981 – Agata Wróbel, Polish weightlifter
- 1982 – Anderson Silva de França, Brazilian footballer
- 1982 – Kevin McNaughton, Scottish footballer
- 1982 – Thiago Motta, Brazilian-Italian footballer
- 1982 – Carlos Quentin, American baseball player
- 1983 – Lasith Malinga, Sri Lankan cricketer
- 1983 – Luke McAlister, New Zealand rugby player
- 1983 – Lilli Schwarzkopf, German heptathlete
- 1984 – Will Harris, American baseball player
- 1985 – Kjetil Jansrud, Norwegian skier
- 1986 – Jeff Green, American basketball player
- 1986 – Tommy Hanson, American baseball player (died 2015)
- 1986 – Simon Mannering, New Zealand rugby league player
- 1987 – Caleb Moore, American snowmobile racer (died 2013)
- 1988 – Rosie MacLennan, Canadian trampoline gymnast
- 1989 – César Azpilicueta, Spanish footballer
- 1989 – Valtteri Bottas, Finnish race car driver
- 1989 – Jo Kwon, South Korean singer and dancer
- 1990 – Bojan Krkić, Spanish footballer
- 1991 – Felicio Brown Forbes, German footballer
- 1991 – Andreja Pejić, Bosnian model
- 1992 – Bismack Biyombo, Congolese basketball player
- 1992 – Max Collins, American-Filipino actress and model
- 1992 – Gabriela Drăgoi, Romanian gymnast
- 1993 – Jakub Sokolík, Czech footballer
- 1994 – Manon Arcangioli, French tennis player
- 1994 – Ons Jabeur, Tunisian tennis player
- 1996 – Kim Se-jeong, South Korean actress and singer
- 1998 – Weston McKennie, American soccer player
- 2000 – Marissa Bode, American actress
- 2001 – Kamilla Rakhimova, Russian tennis player
- 2003 – Quvenzhané Wallis, American actress
- 2004 – Kano Fujihira, Japanese entertainer

== Deaths ==
=== Pre-1600 ===
- 388 – Magnus Maximus, Roman emperor (born 335)
- 430 – Augustine of Hippo, Algerian bishop, theologian, and saint (born 354)
- 476 – Orestes, Roman general and politician
- 632 – Fatimah, daughter of Muhammad (born 605)
- 683 – Kʼinich Janaab Pakal I, ajaw of the city-state of Palenque (born 615)
- 770 – Kōken, emperor of Japan (born 718)
- 876 – Louis the German, Frankish king (born 804)
- 919 – He Gui, Chinese general (born 858)
- 1055 – Xing Zong, Chinese emperor (born 1016)
- 1149 – Mu'in ad-Din Unur, Turkish ruler and regent
- 1231 – Eleanor of Portugal, Queen of Denmark
- 1341 – Levon IV, king of Armenia (born 1309)
- 1406 – John de Sutton V, Baron Sutton of Dudley (born 1380)
- 1481 – Afonso V, king of Portugal (born 1432)
- 1540 – Federico II Gonzaga, duke of Mantua (born 1500)

=== 1601–1900 ===
- 1609 – Francis Vere, English governor and general
- 1645 – Hugo Grotius, Dutch playwright, philosopher, and jurist (born 1583)
- 1646 – Johannes Banfi Hunyades, English-Hungarian alchemist, chemist and metallurgist. (born 1576)
- 1648 – George Lisle, English general (born 1610)
- 1648 – Charles Lucas, English general (born 1613)
- 1654 – Axel Oxenstierna, Swedish lawyer and politician, Lord High Chancellor of Sweden (born 1583)
- 1665 – Elisabetta Sirani, Italian painter (born 1638)
- 1678 – John Berkeley, 1st Baron Berkeley of Stratton, English soldier and politician, Lord Lieutenant of Ireland (born 1602)
- 1735 – Edwin Stead, English landowner and cricketer (born 1701)
- 1757 – David Hartley, English psychologist and philosopher (born 1705)
- 1761 – Melchor de Navarrete, Spanish colonial governor of Cartagena de Indias (Colombia, 1739–1742); of Spanish Florida (1749–1752); and of Yucatán (Mexico, 1754–1758) (born 1693)
- 1784 – Junípero Serra, Spanish priest and missionary (born 1713)
- 1793 – Adam Philippe, Comte de Custine, French general (born 1740)
- 1805 – Alexander Carlyle, Scottish church leader and author (born 1722)
- 1818 – Jean Baptiste Point du Sable, American fur trader, founded Chicago (born 1750)
- 1820 – Andrew Ellicott, American surveyor and urban planner (born 1754)
- 1832 – Edward Dando, English thief
- 1839 – William Smith, English geologist and engineer (born 1769)
- 1888 – Julius Krohn, Finnish poet and journalist (born 1835)
- 1891 – Robert Caldwell, English missionary and linguist (born 1814)
- 1900 – Henry Sidgwick, English economist and philosopher (born 1838)

=== 1901–present ===
- 1903 – Frederick Law Olmsted, American journalist and architect, co-designed Central Park (born 1822)
- 1919 – Adolf Schmal, Austrian fencer and cyclist (born 1872)
- 1934 – Edgeworth David, Welsh-Australian geologist and explorer (born 1858)
- 1937 – George Prendergast, Australian politician, 28th Premier of Victoria (born 1854)
- 1943 – Georg Hellat, Estonian architect (born 1870)
- 1943 – Boris III of Bulgaria (born 1894)
- 1955 – Emmett Till, African-American kidnapping and lynching victim (born 1941)
- 1959 – Bohuslav Martinů, Czech-American composer and educator (born 1890)
- 1965 – Giulio Racah, Italian-Israeli physicist and mathematician (born 1909)
- 1968 – Dimitris Pikionis, Greek architect and academic (born 1887)
- 1971 – Reuvein Margolies, Israeli author and scholar (born 1889)
- 1972 – Prince William of Gloucester (born 1941)
- 1975 – Fritz Wotruba, Austrian sculptor (born 1907)
- 1976 – Anissa Jones, American actress (born 1958)
- 1978 – Bruce Catton, American historian and journalist (born 1899)
- 1978 – Robert Shaw, English actor (born 1927)
- 1981 – Béla Guttmann, Hungarian footballer, coach, and manager (born 1899)
- 1982 – Geoff Chubb, South African cricketer (born 1911)
- 1984 – Muhammad Naguib, Egyptian general and politician, 1st President of Egypt (born 1901)
- 1985 – Ruth Gordon, American actress and screenwriter (born 1896)
- 1986 – Russell Lee, American photographer and journalist (born 1903)
- 1987 – John Huston, Irish actor, director, and screenwriter (born 1906)
- 1988 – Jean Marchand, Canadian union leader and politician, 43rd Secretary of State for Canada (born 1918)
- 1988 – Max Shulman, American author and screenwriter (born 1919)
- 1989 – John Steptoe, American author and illustrator (born 1950)
- 1990 – Willy Vandersteen, Belgian author and illustrator (born 1913)
- 1991 – Alekos Sakellarios, Greek director and screenwriter (born 1913)
- 1993 – William Stafford, American poet and academic (born 1914)
- 1995 – Earl W. Bascom, American rodeo performer and painter (born 1906)
- 1995 – Michael Ende, German scientist and author (born 1929)
- 2005 – Jacques Dufilho, French actor (born 1914)
- 2005 – Esther Szekeres, Hungarian-Australian mathematician and academic (born 1910)
- 2005 – George Szekeres, Hungarian-Australian mathematician and academic (born 1911)
- 2006 – Heino Lipp, Estonian shot putter and discus thrower (born 1922)
- 2006 – Benoît Sauvageau, Canadian educator and politician (born 1963)
- 2006 – Melvin Schwartz, American physicist and academic, Nobel Prize laureate (born 1932)
- 2007 – Arthur Jones, American businessman, founded Nautilus, Inc. and MedX Corporation (born 1926)
- 2007 – Hilly Kristal, American businessman, founded CBGB (born 1932)
- 2007 – Paul MacCready, American engineer and businessman, founded AeroVironment (born 1925)
- 2007 – Francisco Umbral, Spanish journalist and author (born 1935)
- 2007 – Miyoshi Umeki, Japanese-American actress (born 1929)
- 2008 – Phil Hill, American race car driver (born 1927)
- 2009 – Adam Goldstein, American drummer, DJ, and producer (born 1973)
- 2009 – Richard Egan, US Ambassador, Owner of Dell EMC, Engineer (born 1936)
- 2010 – William P. Foster, American bandleader and educator (born 1919)
- 2011 – Bernie Gallacher, English footballer (born 1967)
- 2012 – Rhodes Boyson, English educator and politician (born 1925)
- 2012 – Shulamith Firestone, Canadian-American activist and author (born 1945)
- 2012 – Dick McBride, American author, poet, and playwright (born 1928)
- 2012 – Saul Merin, Polish-Israeli ophthalmologist and academic (born 1933)
- 2012 – Ramón Sota, Spanish golfer (born 1938)
- 2013 – John Bellany, Scottish painter and academic (born 1942)
- 2013 – Lorella Cedroni, Italian political scientist and philosopher (born 1961)
- 2013 – Edmund B. Fitzgerald, American businessman (born 1926)
- 2013 – Frank Pulli, American baseball player and umpire (born 1935)
- 2013 – Barry Stobart, English footballer (born 1938)
- 2013 – Rafael Díaz Ycaza, Ecuadorian journalist, author, and poet (born 1925)
- 2014 – Glenn Cornick, English bass guitarist (born 1947)
- 2014 – Hal Finney, American cryptographer and programmer (born 1956)
- 2014 – John Anthony Walker, American soldier and spy (born 1937)
- 2015 – Al Arbour, Canadian-American ice hockey player and coach (born 1932)
- 2015 – Mark Krasniqi, Kosovan ethnographer, poet, and translator (born 1920)
- 2015 – Nelson Shanks, American painter and educator (born 1937)
- 2016 – Juan Gabriel, Mexican singer and songwriter (born 1950)
- 2016 – Mr. Fuji, American professional wrestler and manager (born 1934)
- 2017 – Mireille Darc, French actress and model (born 1938)
- 2020 – Chadwick Boseman, American actor and playwright (born 1976)
- 2024 – Obi Ndefo, American actor (born 1972)
- 2024 – Steve Silberman, American writer and journalist (born 1957)
- 2026 – Harald V of Norway (born 1937)

== Holidays and observances ==
- Christian feast day:
  - Alexander of Constantinople
  - Augustine of Hippo
  - Edmund Arrowsmith
  - Florentina
  - Hermes
  - Joaquina Vedruna de Mas
  - Moses the Black
  - August 28 (Eastern Orthodox liturgics)
- National Grandparents Day (Mexico)
