= Hostage =

Person seized by abductor to compel action by another party

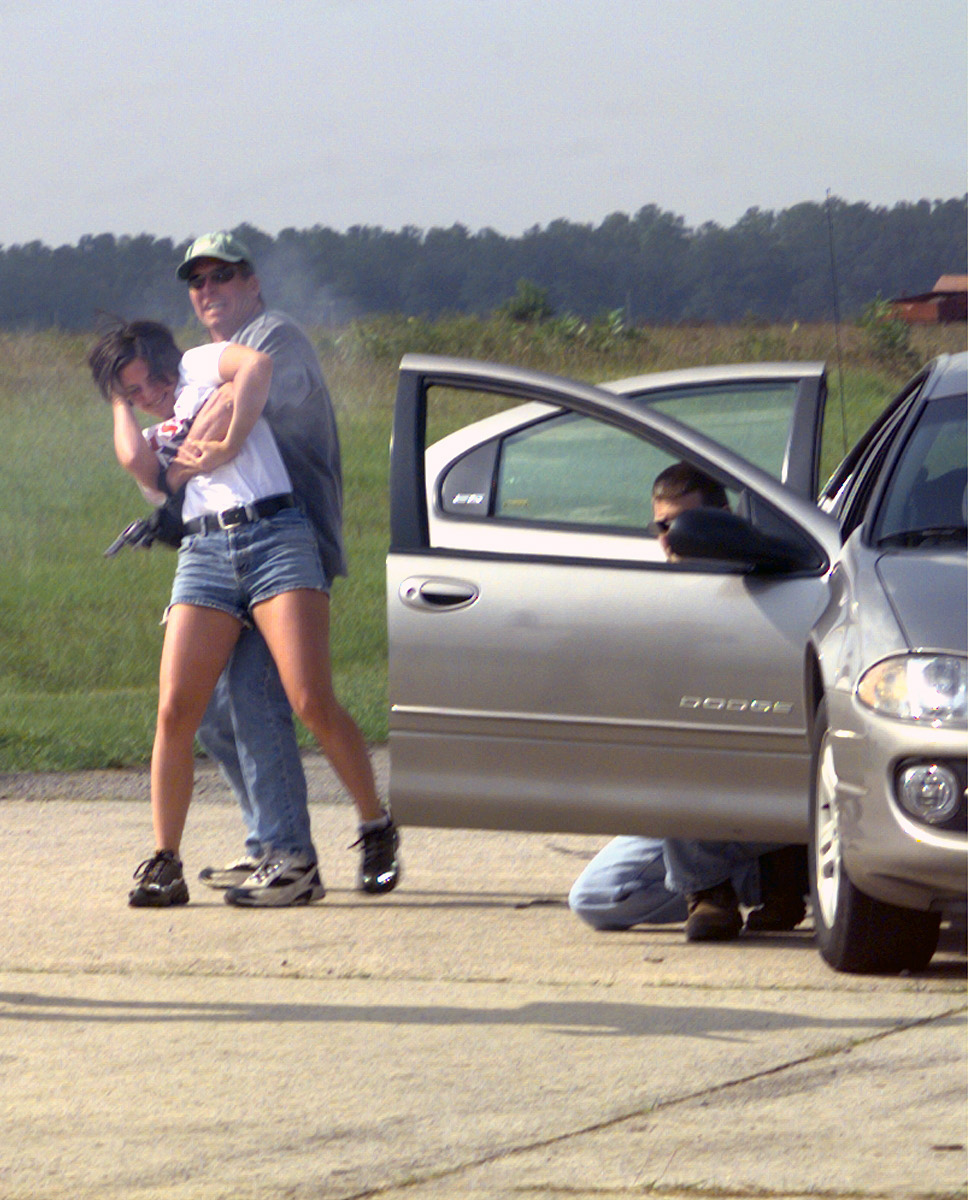
Police trainees recovering a hostage during a training exercise

A hostage is a person seized by an abductor in order to compel another party, one which places a high value on the liberty, well-being and safety of the person seized—such as a relative, employer, law enforcement, or government—to act, or refrain from acting, in a certain way, often under threat of serious physical harm or death to the hostage(s) after expiration of an ultimatum. The Encyclopædia Britannica Eleventh Edition defines a hostage as "a person who is handed over by one of two belligerent parties to the other or seized as security for the carrying out of an agreement, or as a preventive measure against certain acts of war."

A party who seizes one or more hostages is known as a hostage-taker; if the hostages are present voluntarily, then the receiver is known as a host.

FLIR footage of a temporary hostage situation, hosted on LiveLeak.

In civil society, along with kidnapping for ransom and human trafficking (often willing to ransom its captives when lucrative or to trade on influence), hostage taking is a criminal activity. In the military context, hostages are distinct from prisoners of war—despite prisoners being used as collateral in prisoner exchange—and hostage taking is regarded as a war crime.

Hostage taking and kidnapping are prone to blend together. When the goal is strictly financial, the primary lens is one of extortion, even in the face of a severe threat to the safety of the captive person if the financial negotiation fails; conversely, when the goal is political or geopolitical, the primary lens is terrorism.

When looking at hostage-taking from the primary lens of terrorism, there are reasons to believe that certain government types are more susceptible to hostage-taking terrorism than others. In democratic governments, for example, elements related to their democratic ideals such as freedom of the press, constraints on the executive, free elections, and higher levels of civil liberties create favorable outcomes that enable hostage-takers to target these countries specifically. Hostage-takers understand that by targeting democratic governments, they are more likely to seek concessions and/or negotiate with them based on the level of accountability they must face from their citizens who elect them into office, and the media within the country which reports on such events in a capacity independent from the state.

== Etymology ==
The English word hostage derives from French ostage, modern otage, from Late Latin obsidaticum (Medieval Latin ostaticum, ostagium), the state of being an obses (plural obsides), 'hostage', from Latin obsideō 'I haunt/frequent/blockade/besiege', but an etymological connection was later supposed with Latin hostis 'stranger', later 'enemy'.

== Historical practices ==
The long history of political and military use indicates that political authorities or generals would legally agree to hand over one or usually several hostages in the custody of the other side, as guarantee of good faith in the observance of obligations. These obligations would be in the form of signing of a peace treaty, in the hands of the victor, or even exchange hostages as mutual assurance in cases such as an armistice. Major powers, such as Ancient Rome and European colonial powers, would especially receive many such political hostages, often offspring of the elite, even princes or princesses who were generally treated according to their rank and put to a subtle long-term use where they would be given an elitist education or possibly even a religious conversion. This would eventually influence them culturally and open the way for an amicable political line if they ascended to power after release. Sometimes when a man from one nation was hostage in another nation, his position as hostage was more or less voluntary: for example the position of Æscferð son of Ecglāf, who was a Northumbrian hostage in Wessex; he fought under Byrhtnōð against Vikings in the Battle of Maldon on 10 August 991 AD (ref. lines 265 etseq), and probably died in battle there. In Greek, 'Ομηρος means "Homer" and also "hostage", a coincidence which is part of the debate over Homer's identity.

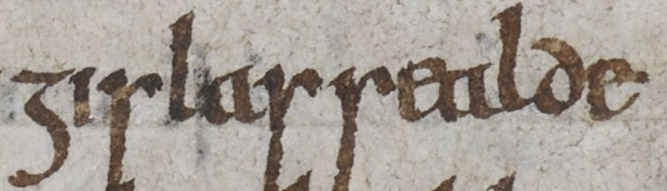
"Gislas" was an Old English word for "hostages", demonstrating that the practice was commonplace in England long before the word "hostage" was coined.

The Anglo-Saxon practice caused the element gīsl = "hostage" in many old Germanic personal names, such as Ēadgils, Cynegils, Gīslheard, and Gīslbeorht. This has been imported into placenames derived from personal names, for example Isleworth in west London (UK) from Old English Gīslheres wyrð (= "enclosure belonging to [a man called] Gīslhere").

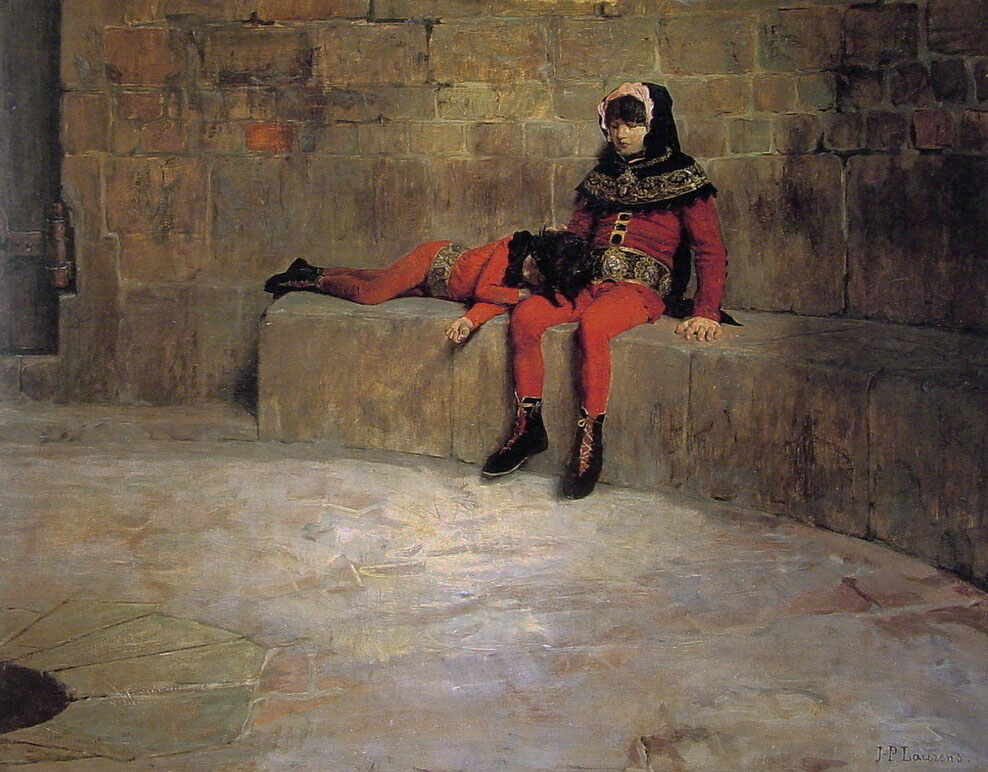
"Hostages", 1896 painting by Jean-Paul Laurens, Musée des Beaux-Arts, Lyon

The practice of taking hostages is very ancient, and has been used constantly in negotiations with conquered nations, and in cases such as surrenders, armistices and the like, where the two belligerents depended for its proper carrying out on each other's good faith. The Romans were accustomed to take the sons of tributary princes and educate them at Rome, thus holding a security for the continued loyalty of the conquered nation and also instilling a possible future ruler with ideas of Roman civilization. The practice was also commonplace in the Imperial Chinese tributary system, especially between the Han and Tang dynasties.

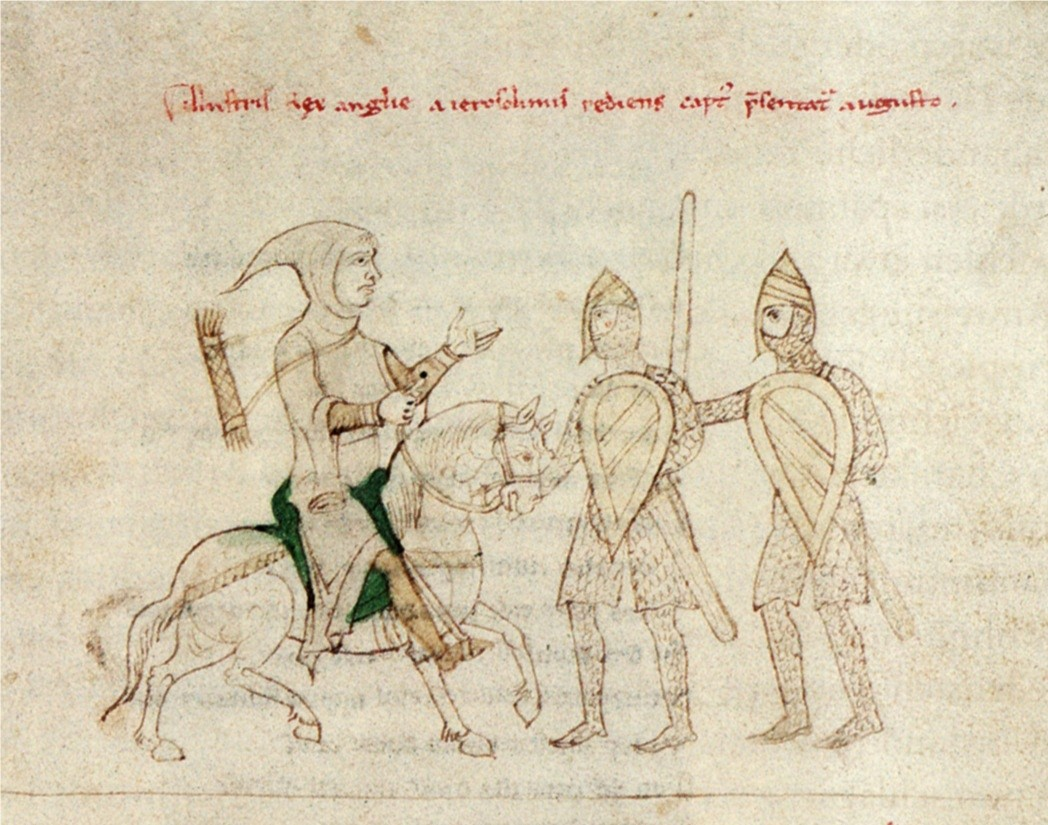
Capture of Richard the Lionheart by knights bearing shields and helmets with depictions resembling the Austrian Bindenschild, at Erdberg near Vienna on 21/22 December 1192 (from a book dating to 1196). The substantial ransom enabled the generous expansion of Vienna, which became a residence city in 1155.

The practice continued through the early Middle Ages. The Irish High King Niall of the Nine Hostages got his epithet Noígiallach because, by taking nine petty kings hostage, he had subjected nine other principalities to his power.

This practice was also adopted in the early period of company rule in India, and by France during the French colonization of North Africa. The position of a hostage was that of a prisoner of war, to be retained until the negotiations or treaty obligations were carried out, and liable to punishment (in ancient times), and even to death, in case of treachery or refusal to fulfil the promises made.

The practice of taking hostages as security for the carrying out of a treaty between civilized states is now obsolete. The last occasion was at the Treaty of Aix-la-Chapelle (1748), ending the War of the Austrian Succession, when two British peers, Henry Bowes Howard, 11th Earl of Suffolk, and Charles, 9th Baron Cathcart, were sent to France as hostages for the restitution of Cape Breton to France.

In France, after the revolution of Prairial (June 18, 1799), the so-called law of hostages was passed, to meet the royalist insurrection in La Vendée. Relatives of émigrés were taken from disturbed districts and imprisoned, and were liable to execution at any attempt to escape. Sequestration of their property and deportation from France followed on the murder of a republican, four to every such murder, with heavy fines on the whole body of hostages. The law only resulted in an increase in the insurrection. In 1796 Napoleon had used similar measures to deal with the insurrection in Lombardy.

In later times the practice of official war hostages may be said to be confined to either securing the payment of enforced contributions or requisitions in an occupied territory and the obedience to regulations the occupying army may think fit to issue; or as a precautionary measure, to prevent illegitimate acts of war or violence by persons not members of the recognized military forces of the enemy.

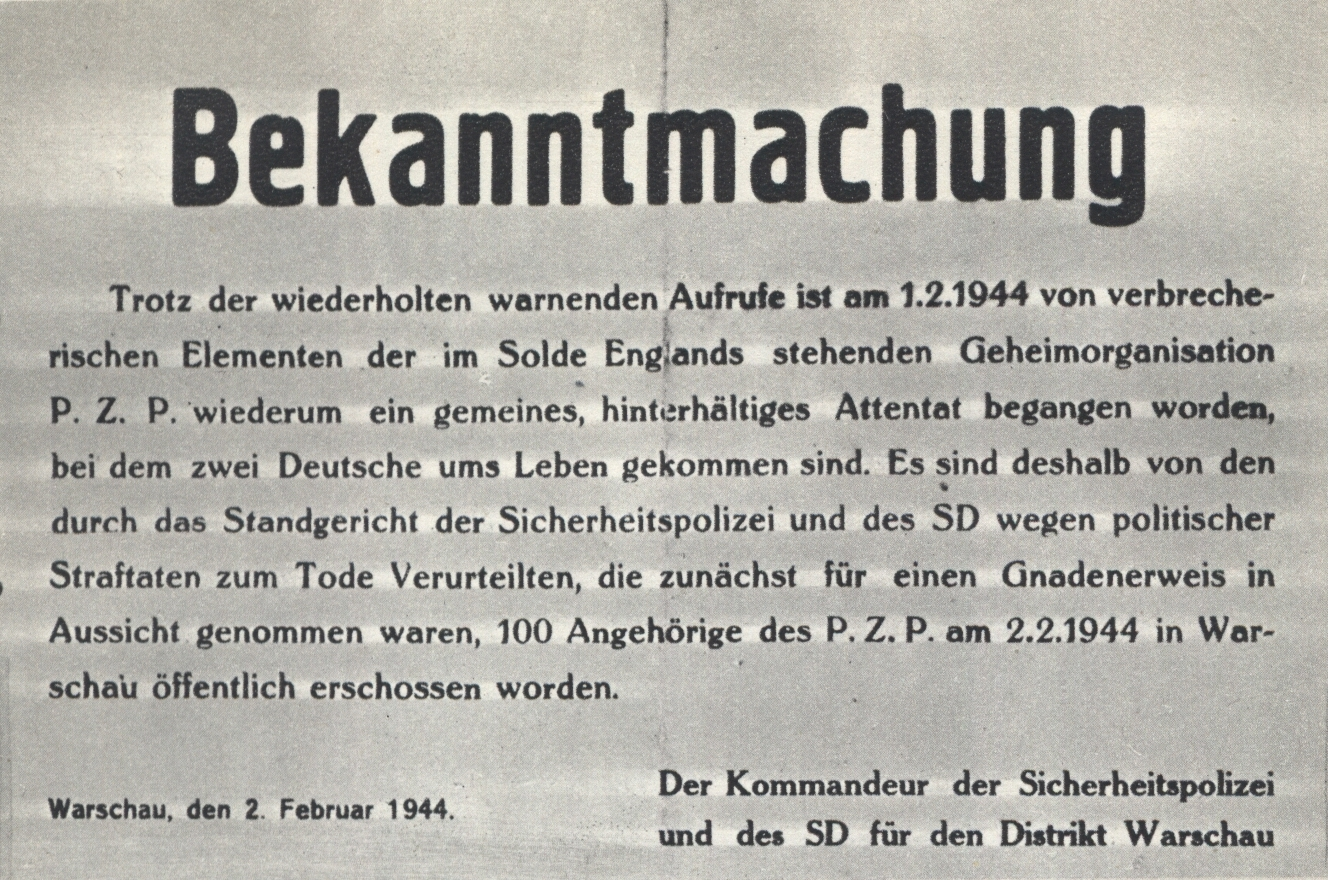
German announcement of the execution of 100 Polish hostages as revenge for death of 2 Germans in Warsaw, occupied Poland, February 1944

During the Franco-Prussian War of 1870, the Germans took as hostages the prominent people or officials from towns or districts when making requisitions and also when foraging, and it was a general practice for the mayor and adjoint of a town which failed to pay a fine imposed upon it to be seized as hostages and retained until the money was paid. Another case where hostages have been taken in modern warfare has been the subject of much discussion. In 1870 the Germans found it necessary to take special measures to put a stop to train-wrecking by "Francs-tireurs" - i.e. "parties in occupied territory not belonging to the recognized armed forces of the enemy", which was considered an illegitimate act of war. Prominent citizens were placed on the engine of the train so that it might be understood that in every accident caused by the hostility of the inhabitants their compatriots will be the first to suffer. The measure seems to have been effective. In 1900 during the Second Boer War, by a proclamation issued at Pretoria (June 19), Lord Roberts adopted the plan for a similar reason, but shortly afterwards (July 29) it was abandoned.

The Germans also, between the surrender of a town and its final occupation, took hostages as security against outbreaks of violence by the inhabitants.

Most writers on international law have regarded this method of preventing such acts of hostility as unjustifiable, on the ground that the persons taken as hostages are not the persons responsible for the act; that, as by the usage of war hostages are to be treated strictly as prisoners of war, such an exposure to danger is transgressing the rights of a belligerent; and as useless, for the mere temporary removal of important citizens until the end of a war cannot be a deterrent unless their mere removal deprives the combatants of persons necessary to the continuance of the acts aimed at. On the other hand, it has been urged that the acts, the prevention of which is aimed at, are not legitimate acts on the part of the armed forces of the enemy, but illegitimate acts by private persons, who, if caught, could be quite lawfully punished, and that a precautionary and preventive measure is more reasonable than reprisals. It may be noticed, however, that the hostages would suffer should the acts aimed at be performed by the authorized belligerent forces of the enemy.

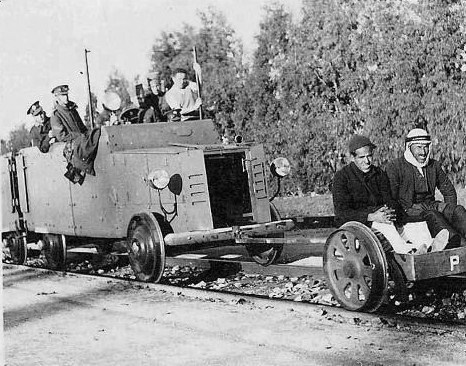
A British armoured railway wagon behind a railcar on which two Arab hostages are seated, Palestine Mandate, 1936

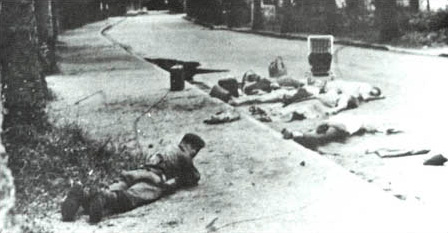
Belgian soldier in front of dead hostages, November 1964 in Stanleyville, Congo. Belgian paratroopers freed over 1,800 European hostages held by Congolese rebels during the Congo Crisis.

Article 50 of the 1907 Hague Convention on Land Warfare provides that: "No general penalty, pecuniary or otherwise, can be inflicted on the population on account of the acts of individuals for which it cannot be regarded as collectively responsible." The regulations, however do not allude to the practice of taking hostage.

In May 1871, at the close of the Paris Commune, took place the massacre of the so-called hostages. Strictly they were not hostages, for they had not been handed over or seized as security for the performance of any undertaking or as a preventive measure, but merely in retaliation for the death of their leaders E. V. Duval and Gustave Flourens. The massacre occurred after the defeat at Mont Valrien on the 4 April and the entry of the army into Paris on the 21 May. Among the 52 victims who were shot in batches the most noticeable were Georges Darboy, archbishop of Paris, the Abbé Deguery, curé of the Madeleine, and the president of the Court of Cassation, Louis Bernard Bonjean.

== Legality of hostage-taking ==
Taking hostages in modern terms is considered a crime or an act of terrorism; the use of the word in this sense of abductee became current only in the 1970s. The criminal activity is known as kidnapping. An acute situation where hostages are kept in a building or a vehicle that has been taken over by armed terrorists or common criminals is often called a hostage crisis.

Common Article 3 of the 1949 Geneva Conventions states that the taking of hostages during an internal conflict is a war crime and shall remain prohibited at any time and in any place whatsoever. In international conflicts, Articles 34 and 147 of the Fourth Geneva Convention state that using protected civilians as hostages is a grave breach of the convention. These conventions are supplemented by Article 75(2)(c) of Additional Protocol I in international conflicts and Article 4(2)(c) of Additional Protocol II in internal conflicts.

The International Convention against the Taking of Hostages—which prohibits hostage-taking and mandates the punishment of hostage-takers—was adopted by the United Nations General Assembly in 1979. The treaty came into force in 1983 and has been ratified by all but 24 of the member states of the United Nations.

Hostage-taking is still often politically motivated or intended to raise a ransom or to enforce an exchange against other hostages or even condemned convicts. However, in some countries hostage-taking for profit has become an "industry", ransom often being the only demand.

=== Hostage-taking in the United States ===
==== Hostage Taking Act ====
The United States makes hostage-taking a federal criminal offense pursuant to 18 U.S.C. § 1203. Generally, the Act applies to conduct occurring within the territory of the United States. However, under Subsection B, an offender may be indicted under the Act even if the hostage-taking occurred outside the territory of the United States if the "offender or the person seized or detained is a national of the United States; the offender is found in the United States; or the governmental organization sought to be compelled is the Government of the United States." These provisions are consistent with the fundamental principles of international criminal law, specifically active nationality principle, universal principle, and the effects principle, respectively.

==== 18 USC 1203: Hostage Taking Act ====
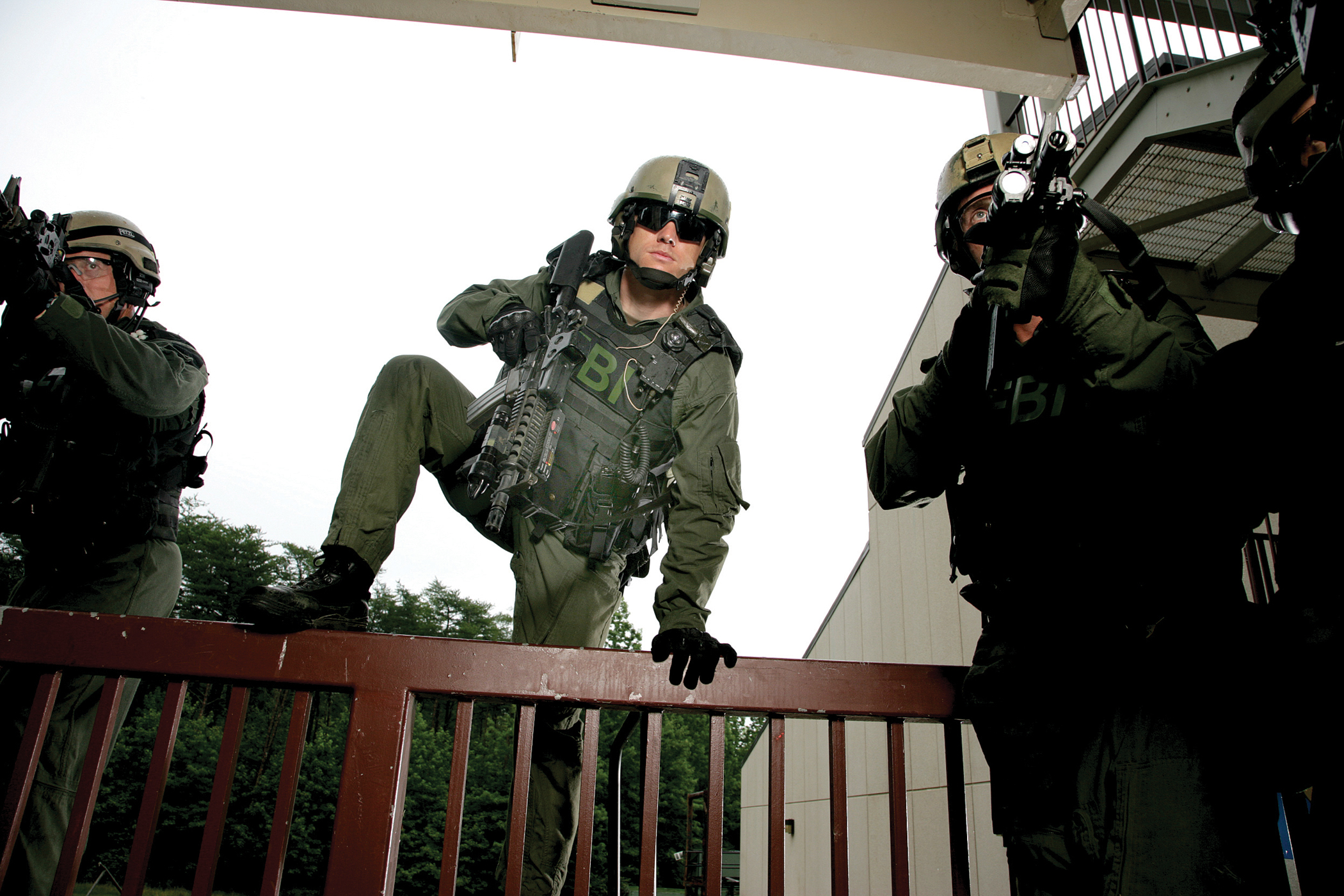
Hostage Rescue Team agents

Title 18 of the United States Code criminalizes hostage-taking under "18 USC 1203: Hostage Taking Act", which reads:

(a) Except as provided in subsection (b) of this section, whoever, whether inside or outside the United States, seizes or detains and threatens to kill, to injure, or to continue to detain another person in order to compel a third person or a governmental organization to do or abstain from doing any act as an explicit or implicit condition for the release of the person detained, or attempts or conspires to do so, shall be punished by imprisonment for any term of years or for life and, if the death of any person results, shall be punished by death or life imprisonment.

(b)(1) It is not an offense under this section if the conduct required for the offense occurred outside the United States unless—

(A) the offender or the person seized or detained is a national of the United States;
(B) the offender is found in the United States; or
(C) the governmental organization sought to be compelled is the Government of the United States.

(2) It is not an offense under this section if the conduct required for the offense occurred inside the United States, each alleged offender and each person seized or detained are nationals of the United States, and each alleged offender is found in the United States, unless the governmental organization sought to be compelled is the Government of the United States.

(c) As used in this section, the term "national of the United States" has the meaning given such term in section 101(a)(22) of the Immigration and Nationality Act (8 U.S.C. § 1101 (a)(22)).

The Hostage Taking Act is a subsection of the International Convention Against the Taking of Hostages. It became enforceable in the United States January 6, 1985.

== Ransom payment strategies ==
The United States has had an official policy of "we do not negotiate with terrorists" since the Nixon Administration. This applies to designated international terrorist groups, but not domestic kidnappers, foreign governments, or international organized crime. The United Kingdom has a similar policy, but many continental European countries, including France and Spain, routinely pay ransom.

The former head of the Committee to Protect Journalists, Joel Simon, found that evidence suggests this policy has reduced the number of Americans who survive kidnapping but has not reduced the number who are kidnapped in the first place. Spain retrieves all of its hostages with a policy of paying ransoms, but in the United States only about one quarter survive. Simon says that terrorists exploit these policy differences by making money from countries who do pay ransom, and using those that do not pay ransom to demonstrate their willingness to kill hostages and thus raise ransom prices and public pressure to pay. In the absence of a universal refusal to pay, which would eliminate any incentive for kidnapping, Simon says the best way to reduce kidnappings and prevent the use of ransom funds to fund other harmful activities is to pay ransom, free the hostages and then use the information gleaned from the negotiation and handoff to destroy the group responsible.

== Notable hostages crises ==
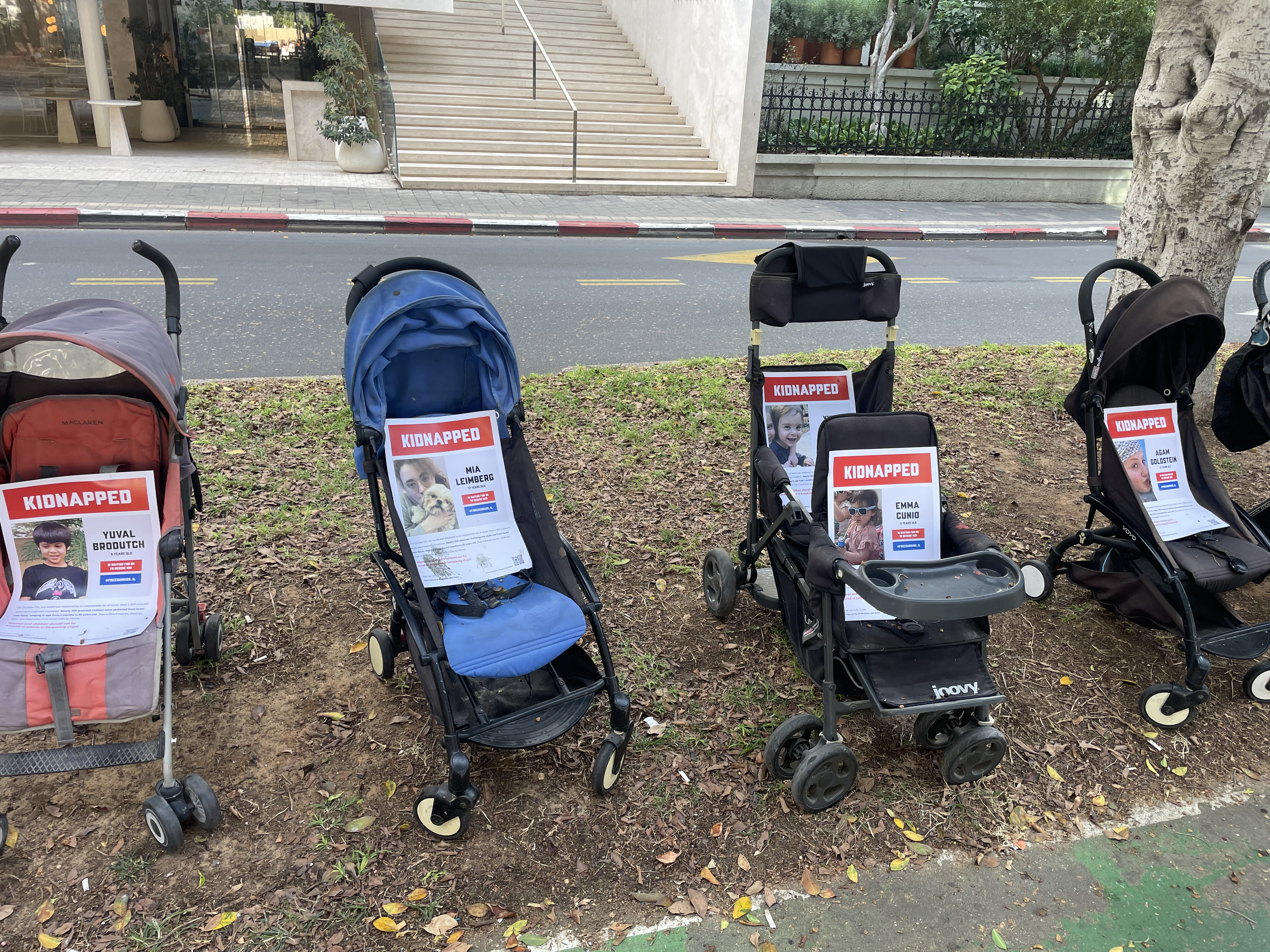
Empty strollers symbolize the children abducted, displayed at a demonstration demanding the return of Israelis held by Hamas in Gaza in Tel Aviv in 2023.

Several hostage crises have stood out in history due to their impact, duration, and the international attention they garnered. Some notable crises include:

- The Munich massacre (1972) - During the 1972 Summer Olympics in Munich, West Germany, a Palestinian terrorist group known as Black September took eleven Israeli Olympic team members hostage and killed them along with a West German police officer.
- The Norrmalmstorg robbery (23-28 August 1973) - Four bank employees and civilians were taken hostages by Jan-Erik Olsson in kreditbanken while he was in parole, two police officers were injured while trying to communicate with the robber. It is best known as the origin of the term Stockholm syndrome.
- The Iranian Embassy Siege (1980) - A group of six armed men stormed the Iranian Embassy on Prince's Gate in South Kensington, London. The gunmen, Iranian Arabs, took 26 people hostage, including embassy staff, several visitors and a Metropolitan Police officer. The crisis ended with the Special Air Service (SAS) storming the building, killing 5 of the 6 gunmen.
- The Air France Flight 8969 (Operation Rock Climber) Hijack (1994) was a plane hijack that lasted 3 days. GIA Terrorists who dressed up as officers hijacked the Air flight, their motivation was to release their prisoners in Algeria and potentially crash the plane to the eiffel tower. The GIGN stormed the plane neutralizing all of the terrorists. The Operation was a success.
- The Iran hostage crisis (1979-1981) - Iranian students stormed the U.S. Embassy in Tehran, taking 52 American diplomats and citizens hostage for 444 days. The crisis ended with the hostages' release, minutes after Ronald Reagan was sworn in as the U.S. president.
- The Japanese embassy hostage crisis (1996-1997) - Members of terrorist organization MRTA in Peru took hundreds of hostages at the Japanese ambassador's residence in Lima. The siege lasted 126 days and ended with a government raid, which resulted in the deaths of all the insurgents and one hostage.
- The Moscow theater hostage crisis (2002) - Chechen terrorists took 850 hostages during a performance at the Dubrovka Theater. Russian forces pumped narcotic gas into the building before storming it, which led to the deaths of at least 170 people, including 130 hostages.
- The Beslan school siege (2004) - Over 1,100 people were taken hostage, including 777 children, after armed Chechen separatists seized a school in Beslan, North Ossetia, Russia. The crisis lasted three days and ended with over 330 deaths, including 186 children.
- The In Amenas hostage crisis (2013) - An al-Qaeda affiliated group took over 800 people hostage at the Tigantourine gas facility in In Amenas, Algeria. The Algerian army's intervention resulted in at least 39 foreign hostages killed along with 29 militants.
- The Gaza war hostage crisis (2023-) - 251 Israeli civilians and soldiers, dual citizens, and foreign nationals were taken as hostages by Hamas to the Gaza Strip, of which the number of kidnapped children was about 30. As of October 31, all 20 living hostages have been released from captivity, with 13 deceased bodies still being held captive.

== Notable hostages ==
=== Pre-1900 ===
- Philip II of Macedon (382 BC – 336 BC), held as hostage by the Thebes, led by Epaminondas and Pelopidas.
- Polybius (200 BC – 118 BC), Greek historian
- Julius Caesar (100 BC – 44 BC)
- Niall of the nine hostages (400)
- Theodoric the Great (454 – 526)
- Richard I of England (1157 – 1199), Richard the Lionheart, English king returning from the Third Crusade
- Vlad the Impaler (c. 1429 – 1477), and his brother Radu were held as hostages by the Ottoman Sultan during their childhood to guarantee the co-operation of their father
- Atahualpa (c. 1502 – 1533)
- Henry II (1519 – 1559), and his brother Francis were hostages of Emperor Charles V for three years during their childhood to ensure that their father abided by the Treaty of Madrid (1526)
- Tokugawa Ieyasu (1543 – 1616), first Tokugawa shogun of Japan, spent his childhood as a hostage
- Miguel de Cervantes (c. 1547 – 1616), author of Don Quixote

=== 1900 - present ===
- Patty Hearst (1974–1975)
- David S. Dodge (1982)
- William Buckley (1984)
- Terry A. Anderson (1985–1991)
- John McCarthy (1986–1991)
- Terry Waite (1987–1991)
- Jaycee Lee Dugard (1991–2009)
- Daniel Pearl (2002)
- Íngrid Betancourt (2002–2008)
- Austin Tice (2012–ongoing)
- Noa Argamani (2023–2024)

== See also ==
- Foreign hostages in Afghanistan
- Foreign hostages in Iraq
- Foreign hostages in Nigeria
- Foreign hostages in Somalia
- Hostage MP
- Hostage Taking Act
- Pidyon shvuyim
- Sklavenkasse
- Lebanon Hostage Crisis
- List of hostage crises
- Missing Iranian Diplomats
