= Clark (TV series) =

2022 Swedish miniseries

- Genre: Crime drama
- Based on: Vafan var det som hände? by Clark Olofsson
- Written by: Fredrik Agetoft; Peter Arrhenius; Jonas Åkerlund
- Directed by: Jonas Åkerlund
- Starring: Bill Skarsgård
- Composer: Mikael Åkerfeldt
- Country of origin: Sweden
- Original language: Swedish
- No. of seasons: 1
- No. of episodes: 6

Production
- Executive producers: Hans Engholm; Jonas Åkerlund; Bill Skarsgård
- Producers: Julia Stannard; Börje Jansson; Patrick Sobieski
- Cinematography: Eric Broms
- Editors: Rickard Krantz; Nils Moström
- Running time: 54-69 minutes
- Production company: Scandinavian Content Group

Original release
- Network: Netflix
- Release: 5 May 2022

Clark is a 2022 Swedish six-episode television miniseries starring Bill Skarsgård, produced by Netflix, released on 5 May 2022. It is based on the life of Clark Olofsson and includes, in episode four, the events of the Norrmalmstorg robbery.

== Cast and characters ==
- Bill Skarsgård as Clark Olofsson
  - Kolbjörn Skarsgård as Clark (age 7)
  - Lukas Wetterberg as Teen Clark
- Vilhelm Blomgren as Tommy Lindström
- Isabelle Grill as Madou
- Malin Levanon as Liz
- Hanna Björn as Maria
- Peter Viitanen as Sten Olofsson, Clark's father
- Sandra Ilar as Ingbritt Olofsson, Clark's mother
- Björn Gustafsson as Kaj-Robert
- Adam Lundgren as Kurre Räven, known as "Kurre the Fox"
- Agnes Lindström Bolmgren as Ingela
- Christoffer Nordenrot as Jan-Erik "Janne" Olsson
- Claes Malmberg as Tage Erlander
- Daniel Hallberg as Hiller
- Alicia Agneson as Kristin "Kicki" Ehnmark
- Sofie Hoflack as Marijke
- Alida Morberg as Sussi Korsner
- Tommy Körberg as Judge
- Benas Druktenis and Grytis Druktenis as Jon
- Lina Ljungqvist as Lena Nyman
- Tobias Forge as fiddler

== Episodes ==
No.	Title	Directed by	Written by	Original release date
1	"Being the Best at Being the Best Was Not My Thing, So I Decided to Be the Best at Being the Worst"	Jonas Åkerlund	Fredrik Agetoft, Peter Arrhenius, Jonas Åkerlund	5 May 2022
The year is 1965. Teenage delinquent Clark Olofsson and a band of friends break into a posh summer villa. They escape when Clark discovers it actually belongs to Prime Minister Tage Erlander. Clark is arrested after crashing his stolen getaway car, nearly dying in the process, but quickly escapes. When he meets wealthy mother Liz and her daughter Madou, he cons his way into staying in their guest room. He has sex with both women, steals a handful of jewelry, and moves to the city. He resolves to make Madou his girlfriend and decides to rob a bank so he can impress her with his wealth. While robbing a camping supply store, his partner-in-crime, Gunnar, shoots and kills a police officer. Clark flees and meets Madou in secret. He confesses his love and tells her not to believe what the media say about him. Detective Tommy Lindström and a team of police ambush and arrest Clark. He is acquitted of killing the police officer, but is sent back to prison. He and Madou become a couple.
2	"I Automatically Do Everything Opposite the Rest of the World"	Jonas Åkerlund	Fredrik Agetoft, Peter Arrhenius, Jonas Åkerlund	5 May 2022
Clark proposes marriage to Madou and she accepts. Clark is given furlough to attend his wedding, but he instead flees to the Canary Islands. Before long, Lindström arrives and takes Clark back to Sweden where he is placed in Tidaholm Maximum Security Prison in 1969. The politically-minded Maria inspires him to starts a prisoners' rights movement. In 1972, the warden transfers Clark to minimum security Study Yard in Uppsala. Clark escapes, and he and Maria leave for Beirut, Lebanon. Along the way, Clark encounters an old friend, Kaj-Robert. The group heads to Hamburg, Germany, where Clark and Kaj-Robert have a wild night. The next morning Clark has misplaced all his money, so he and Kaj-Robert rob a bank. Lindström tracks Clark to Hamburg, but he and Maria have already left for Beirut. Throughout the episode, Clark reflects on his childhood and how his mother tried to protect him from his abusive father.
3	"They See Me as a Mix of Pippi Longstocking and Al Capone"	Jonas Åkerlund	Fredrik Agetoft, Peter Arrhenius, Jonas Åkerlund	5 May 2022
Clark traffics drugs from Beirut to Sweden by filling orange rinds with hashish. He meets with drug dealer Kurre the Fox, who promises to sell the hash. Clark robs a bank, picks up a woman named Ingela, and takes her to a disco. Clark is arrested and sentenced to six years in the prison Kalmaranstalten beginning in May, 1973. He and fellow inmate Janne Olsson plan to escape and rob a bank. Janne successfully escapes, but Clark's attempt fails. A disillusioned Maria breaks up with Clark. Ingela informs him that she's pregnant with his child. Clark recalls how he spent time in foster care, and ran away from an abusive caretaker who tried to sexually abuse him. On 23 August 1973, Janne begins the Norrmalmstorg bank robbery and hostage crisis. When Janne asks for Clark, Lindström brings Clark to Norrmalmstorg, gives him a gun, and allows him to go inside the bank to negotiate.
4	"Let the Party Begin"	Jonas Åkerlund	Fredrik Agetoft, Peter Arrhenius, Jonas Åkerlund	5 May 2022
While Janne is taking the Norrmalmstorg robbery seriously, Clark treats it like a party. They get into an argument, but reconcile after nearly being killed by a sniper. Clark endears himself to the hostages, especially a young woman named Kicki, leading to what is now known as Stockholm syndrome. Lindstrom struggles to convince his colleagues that Clark isn't trustworthy. The police eventually lock the robbers and hostages in the bank vault and release tear gas inside, leading to Janne's surrender. Clark claims he was always on the authorities' side. Swedish Prime Minister Olof Palme doesn't believe him and sends Clark back to prison. Clark and Maria reconcile. He manages to smuggle out tens of thousands of krona in his rectum, as well as via an envelope sent to Maria that she gives back to him, unopened. Clark considers himself a genius and a national hero.
5	"Why Would I Have a Job? I Don't Have Time for S**t Like That and You'll Miss Out on All the Fun Stuff"	Jonas Åkerlund	Fredrik Agetoft, Peter Arrhenius, Jonas Åkerlund	5 May 2022
Clark is being held in the Narröpingstanstalten in 1975. He's cast in a play, allowing him furloughs. On opening night, he and Maria run away to Copenhagen, Denmark where they meet up with Kurre. A pocket of the Red Army Faction asks Clark to rob a bank. Clark and Kurre keep most of the money for themselves, causing Maria to leave him for good. Clark and Kurre travel across Europe, buy a boat, and sail into the Atlantic Ocean. They endure a violent storm before ending up in Ostend, Belgium. Clark gives the boat to Kurre, and they go their separate ways. Clark starts a romance with a woman named Marijke. He robs a bank, hides nearly one million krona in the woods, and is arrested in Trosa. He's sent to Kumla Maximum Security Prison for a six year sentence in October, 1976. Marijke tells Clark that she is pregnant and asks him to marry her. He happily accepts.
6	"I've Read Every Book Ever Written, and a Few More"	Jonas Åkerlund	Fredrik Agetoft, Peter Arrhenius, Jonas Åkerlund	5 May 2022
In 1980, writer Sussi Korsner begins interviewing Clark for a book she is writing about his life. He evades questions about his traumatic childhood and seedy past, emphasizing his plan to become a law abiding citizen. However, while on furlough, Clark starts a fight and stabs a man 17 times. He is sentenced to two more years for aggravated assault. While in prison, Clark graduates from journalism school and his mother dies of cancer. Clark is released three years later and he retrieves the bank robbery money in the woods. He, Marijke and their son, Jon, move to Belgium. To fund his new life, Clark and Kurre import drugs to Sweden. In 1984, Clark is caught and sentenced to 10 years in prison. Sussi informs him that Palme was assassinated. She's decided not to publish his biography, as she's realized he's a purely selfish person who uses and discards those who care about him. Clark is unrepentant.

== Soundtrack ==
Music for the series was composed by Mikael Åkerfeldt, frontman of the progressive metal band Opeth, who also cameos as an inmate in episode 2. Tobias Forge, the singer and songwriter behind Ghost, plays a small part as a violinist in episode 6. Amalie Bruun, from Myrkur, plays a member of the revolution group in episode 5.

== Reception ==
Critical response was generally positive from critics. On Rotten Tomatoes, the miniseries has an approval rating of 85% from critics.

Imogen West-Knights wrote a mixed review in The New Statesman, praising Skarsgård's performance in particular while being critical of the show's "breakneck pacing and tonal shifts", and not fully committing to its self-aware commentary.
