= Bonjean =

Bonjean is a French surname. Notable people with the surname include:

- Christophe Ernest Bonjean (1823–1892), French missionary and priest
- Geneviève Page (née Bonjean; born 1927), French actress
- Jennifer Bonjean (born c. 1970), American attorney
- Louis Bernard Bonjean (1804–1871), French jurist
