= Robin Nazari =

Kurdish-Swedish artist and actor

- Born: Sweden
- Occupations: Musician; actor
- Years active: 2019–present
- Known for: Snabba Cash; BIJI
- Awards: Grammis for Music Video of the Year (2025)

Robin Nazari is a Kurdish-Swedish musician and actor. He is best known as one half of the musical duo BIJI, formed with Swedish director and producer Maceo Frost, and for his role as Ari in the Swedish Netflix crime series Snabba Cash (2021).

== Early life ==
Nazari comes from a Kurdish family described as one of musicians and poets. His family speaks the Erdelani dialect of Kurdish; his uncle, singer Hossein Sharifi, was known for his poetic lyricism, and his mother studied Kurdish and Persian literature, while his sister has since become a recognised poet in Sweden.

== Career ==
=== Early music career ===
Nazari first gained recognition in Sweden's rap scene, releasing three solo albums, each of which reportedly reached six-figure streaming totals, before shifting his focus toward acting and, later, the BIJI project.

=== Acting ===
Nazari's breakout screen role came as Ari in the Netflix crime drama Snabba Cash (2021), an adaptation of Jens Lapidus's novel of the same name. He subsequently appeared in the drama series Clark (2022) and the Netflix film The Beautiful Game (2024), the latter alongside Bill Nighy and Michael Ward.

=== BIJI ===
In 2019, Nazari founded BIJI together with Swedish-based director and music producer Maceo Frost. Based in Stockholm, the duo fuses Kurdish and Western Asian musical traditions with hip hop, Afrobeat, Latin, and dance influences, presenting the project as a vehicle for reframing narratives around Kurdish culture and identity. The name Biji translates from Kurdish as "long live."

In May 2022, Nazari and Frost travelled to Kurdistan to film "Zigidi," the first BIJI music video shot in the region, combining elements of action filmmaking with documentary-style footage. "Zigidi" went on to win Best Music Video at the 2025 SXSW Film & TV Festival and Music Video of the Year at the 2025 Grammis, the Swedish music awards.

BIJI released its debut album, BIJI, pt. 1, described by the duo as a tribute to Kurdistan and the Kurdish diaspora. As of 2025, Nazari and Frost were reported to be working on a second studio album and preparing a BIJI Newroz festival.

== Awards ==
Year	Award	Category	Work	Result
2025	Grammis	Music Video of the Year	"Zigidi"	Won
2025	SXSW Film & TV Festival	Best Music Video	"Zigidi"	Won

== Filmography ==
Year	Title	Role	Notes
2021	Snabba Cash	Ari	Netflix series
2022	Clark		Netflix series
2024	The Beautiful Game		Netflix film
