= Nils Bejerot =

Swedish psychiatrist and criminologist (1921–1988)

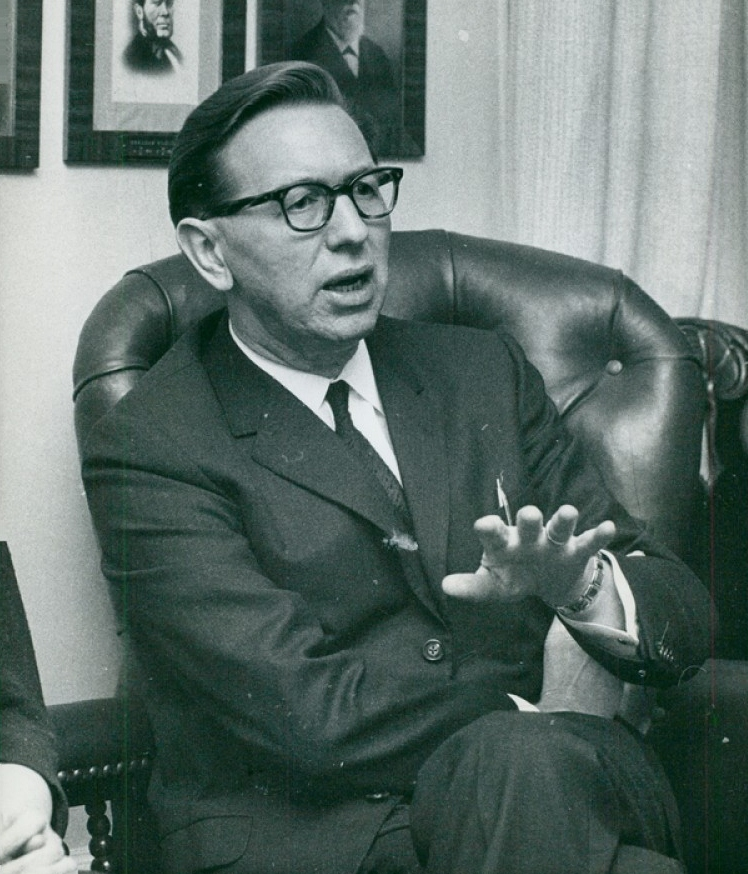
- Nils Bejerot in 1968
- Born: 21 September 1921; Norrtälje, Sweden
- Died: 29 November 1988 (aged 67); Stockholm, Sweden
- Occupations: Psychiatrist; Criminologist

Nils Johan Artur Bejerot (21 September 1921 – 29 November 1988) was a Swedish psychiatrist and criminologist best known for his work on drug abuse and for coining the hypothetical, as not scientifically confirmed phrase Stockholm syndrome. Bejerot was one of the top drug abuse researchers in Sweden. His view that drug abuse was a criminal matter and that drug use should have severe penalties was highly influential in Sweden and in other countries. He believed that the cure for drug addiction was to make drugs unavailable and socially unacceptable. He also advocated the idea that drug abuse could transition from being a symptom to a disease in itself.

== Early life ==
Nils Bejerot was born 1921 in Norrtälje, Stockholm County. His father worked as a bank teller at the local Upland Bank office. Not an avid student, he was more interested in scouting. In 1936 the family moved to Östhammar after his father was assigned to another bank office. At the age of 15, Bejerot was found to have bleeding in the lungs due to tuberculosis and was admitted to a sanatorium for a total of three years. However, Bejerot described this time as a happy period in his life. The mood among the patients was good, despite the fact that approximately one third of them died.

On his first vacation he met English nurse Carol Maurice in the 320 km railway between Samac and Sarajevo in then-Yugoslavia, and they later married.

== Psychiatry ==
In 1952–54, Bejerot served as assistant at the Karolinska Institute hygienic institution after finishing basic medical education at Karolinska Institute. In the same period he wrote his book against the violence in comic books.

In 1954, while serving as deputy social medical officer at the Child and Youth Welfare Board of the City of Stockholm, Bejerot became, by coincidence, the first to diagnose and report a case of juvenile intravenous drug abuse by any public authority in Europe.

In 1957, Bejerot received a medical degree from the Karolinska Institute in Stockholm. From 1957 to 1962, Bejerot was trained in psychiatry at the Södersjukhuset and the Saint Göran Hospital in Stockholm.

From 1958 onwards, Bejerot worked as consulting psychiatrist to the Stockholm Police Department, and from 1965 as consulting physician to the Stockholm Remand Prison. His patients were people in police custody, many of them local alcoholics or drug addicts. Later he became Research Fellow in drug dependence at the Swedish National Medical Research Council, and then a reader in Social Medicine at the Karolinska Institute.

In 1963, Bejerot studied epidemiology and medical statistics at the London School of Hygiene & Tropical Medicine, on a grant from the World Health Organization.

In 1973, he served as a psychiatric advisor during the Norrmalmstorg robbery, and coined the term Stockholm syndrome to refer to the way in which the hostages apparently become grateful to the hostage-takers and critical against the police's handling of the situation. The term has since become heavily used.

In 1975, Bejerot became an associate professor on a doctoral thesis about drug abuse and drug policy at the Karolinska Institute. In 1979 Bejerot received an honorary title of professor, an honor that the Swedish government usually awards to only a few people a year.

His research covered such wide areas as the epidemiology of drug abuse, the dynamics of drug dependence and the anomalies of public welfare policy. Bejerot gave an extensive number of lectures in many parts of Sweden. For 30 years he lobbied intensively for zero tolerance, (Note: Even though Bejerot was criticizing concepts that are today known under the umbrella "harm reduction" and promoting criminal control projects that would today be known as "zero tolerance", he did not use those terms himself.) including possession and use of cannabis. He published about 600 papers and debate articles in different media, and published more than 10 books about the subject. In total he had about 100,000 participants of his 2-day courses. For many years he held lectures at ‘’Polishögskolan’’ (The Swedish Police College) about drug abuse, mental problems and negotiation skills. He was teacher for almost every Swedish police officer, which gave him the epithet "polisdoktorn" (The police doctor).

== Politics ==
During his time in sanatoriums while suffering tuberculosis, he met people of different ages with different experiences, and the discussions they had he later claimed encouraged him to study and become involved in political activity, becoming a member of the Communist Party and other Socialist-affiliated organizations. When he started to study medicine in 1947 his social and political commitments made him a slow student. However, Nikita Khrushchev's secret speech in 1956 at the 20th Party Congress led Bejerot to question the whole communist system; the illusion of the glorious future of communism was definitely shattered when the Soviet Union invaded Hungary, causing Bejerot to quit all activities in politics and focus on the study of medicine.

Bejerot also advocated against violence in comic books. While working at the Karolinska Institute between 1952 and 1954, he wrote his 1954 book Barn, serie, samhälle (Children, Comics, Society), itself largely an adaptation of Fredric Wertham's book Seduction of the Innocent, also published in 1954. He did not come back to this topic in his later books.

Bejerot also strongly advocated for strict anti-drug laws. In 1965, Bejerot started to engage in the Swedish debate on drug abuse, encouraging tough action against the new and rapidly growing problem. He followed closely a rather clumsy experiment with legal prescription of heroin, amphetamine, etc. to drug addicts, studies that formed the basis for his thesis on the epidemic drug spread. Bejerot claimed that the program would increase the number of drug addicts and showed through counting of injection marks that the number of drug addicts in Stockholm continued to grow fast during the experiment. The program was stopped in 1968. From 1968 and onward, the difference between the epidemic type, the therapeutic type and the endemic type of drug abuse was a repeated issue in Bejerot's writing and lectures.

In 1969, Bejerot became one of the founders of the Association for a Drug-Free Society (RNS), which played – and still plays – an important role in shaping Swedish drug policies. Bejerot warned of the consequences of an ‘epidemic addiction’, prompted by young, psychologically and socially unstable persons who, usually after direct personal initiation from another drug abuser, begin to use socially nonaccepted, intoxicating drugs to gain euphoria. In 1972, Bejerots' reports were used as one of the reasons for increasing the maximum penalty for grave drug offences in Sweden to 10 years in prison. In 1974 he was called to testify as one of 21 scientific experts on marijuana for a subcommittee of the United States Senate on the marijuana-hashish epidemic and its impact on United States security.

He advocated zero tolerance for illegal use and possession of drugs, including all drugs not covered by prescription, something that today is law in Sweden. In the early 1980s, he became one of the "Top 10 opinion molders" in Sweden for this. Bejerot is by UNODC and many others recognized as founder of the Swedish strategy against recreational use of drugs. His demand for zero tolerance as a drug policy was for a long time seen as extreme, but during the late 1970s opinion changed. He is without doubt the person most responsible for changing the Swedish drug policy in a restrictive direction something that made him a controversial person, both before and after his death. Many people considered Bejerot as a good humanist advocating a viable policy against narcotics and Robert DuPont considers him "the hero of the Swedish drug abuse story." Others view this as a reactionary hindering of new treatment practices against drug abuse.

Bejerot's theories about spread of drug abuse and proposals for an anti-drug policy have still a significant influence on the drug policy of Sweden. When R. Gil Kerlikowske the Director of National Drug Control Policy in May 2012, announced an updated version of U.S. President Barack Obama's administration's drug policy he referred to what happened in the experiment with legal prescription of drugs in 1965 that was studied by Bejerot in his doctoral thesis.

== Research ==
Before Bejerot began to participate in the debate on drugs in 1965, it was the dominant view in Sweden that drug abuse was a private health problem and that law enforcement measures should be aimed at drug dealers. Before 1968, the maximum offence for a grave drug crime was one year in prison. Bejerot objected to this and stressed the importance of measures against the demand for drugs, against users, and their importance in the spread of addiction to new addicts.

Bejerot did not accept unemployment and poor private economy as explanations for increased use of illegal drugs. He pointed out that alcohol abuse in the 1930s was comparatively limited in Sweden, despite high unemployment and economic depression.

Nils Bejerot stressed five main factors that cause increased risk of an individual of becoming a drug abuser:

- availability of the addictive substance
- money to acquire the substance
- time to use the substance
- example of use of the substance in the immediate environment
- a permissive ideology in relation to the use of the substance

Bejerot advanced the hypothesis that when addiction supervenes it is no longer a symptom but a morbid condition of its own. In the abuse stage one can willfully control their consumption and intoxicating themselves at will, but eventually – depending on the product's addictive qualities, the dosage, the intensity of the abuse, individual factors etc. – the drug abuse can turn into drug dependency, receiving the strength of an instinct. Therefore, its development will not be affected by removal of the initiating factors, and the drug dependency has developed the strength and character of a natural drive, even though it was artificially-induced.

He compared addiction with a very deep love, writing that addiction is "an emotional fixation (sentiment) acquired through learning, which intermittently or continually expresses itself in purposeful, stereotyped behavior with the character and force of a natural drive, aiming at a specific pleasure or the avoidance of a specific discomfort."

This would however not mean that drug addiction was impossible to treat. The abuse was learned, hence it is also possible to relearn, how to live without drugs, and treatment of drug addicts should have a drug-free goal, differing with others who aimed at reduction of adverse effects, also known as harm reduction. Bejerot thus criticized programs of long methadone treatment of opiate users in programs that were not aimed at drug freedom.

== See also ==
- Alfred R. Lindesmith
- War on drugs
- Harm reduction
