= Clark Olofsson =

Swedish criminal (1947–2025)

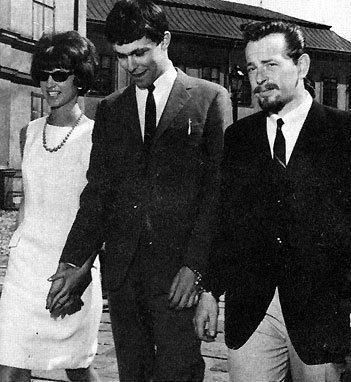
- Olofsson (center) on his way to court in 1967, with his fiancée at the time (left) and cuffed to a policeman (right)
- Born: Clark Oderth Olofsson; 1 February 1947; Trollhättan, Sweden
- Died: 24 June 2025 (aged 78); Arvika, Sweden
- Other name: Daniel Demuynck
- Citizenship: Sweden (1947–1996, 2017–2025); Belgium (1996–2025)
- Known for: Norrmalmstorg robbery
- Spouse: Marijke Demuynck (m. 1976–1999)
- Children: 6

Clark Oderth Olofsson (later known as Daniel Demuynck; 1 February 1947 – 24 June 2025) was a Swedish criminal. He received sentences for attempted murder, assault, robbery and dealing narcotics and spent more than half of his life in prison. Olofsson was often referred to as Sweden's first "celebrity gangster".

He faced a tumultuous childhood marked by familial challenges. Growing up amidst extensive alcohol problems, he endured the departure of his father and his mother's subsequent illness, which led to the placement of Olofsson and his two younger sisters in foster care. Determined to escape an unhappy foster family, Olofsson enrolled in a sailors' school then forged his mother's signature at the age of 15 to be able to embark on the ship Ballade, he sailed around the world, gaining a unique perspective between Japan and South America. Returning home at 15, Olofsson reunited with his mother, who had regained stability. Despite earlier adversities, the family settled in Gothenburg, where Olofsson's journey took a criminal turn. Convicted for various offenses in the 1960s, including burglary and assault, Olofsson gained notoriety for his involvement in the killing of a police officer during a robbery. Multiple prison escapes characterized his criminal career, with notable incidents like the Norrmalmstorg robbery, giving rise to the term "Stockholm syndrome".

Throughout the 1970s and 1980s, Olofsson continued a pattern of escapes, criminal activities, and imprisonments, marked by a marriage in Kumla Prison. Despite his turbulent criminal history, Olofsson pursued education, studying journalism while incarcerated. Released in 1983, he left Sweden with his wife, settling in Belgium. However, his criminal activities persisted, resulting in a drug smuggling conviction in 1999. The subsequent decades saw Olofsson's involvement in various criminal enterprises, leading to multiple arrests, imprisonments, and deportation. His life story, filled with escapes, convictions, and legal battles, became the subject of films, documentaries, and a Netflix drama series in 2022.

== Biography ==
=== Early years ===
Olofsson was born on 1 February 1947 in Trollhättan, Sweden, into a home with extensive problems. Olofsson had two younger sisters. His mother was a cashier and his father an asphalt worker. When Clark was 11 years old, his father left the family and soon after, his mother fell ill and was admitted to Lillhagens psychiatric hospital in Hisings Backa. Her problems led to the three children being placed in foster care. Olofsson was unhappy in his foster family and to get out of there, he forged his mother's signature and enrolled in a sailors' school. On the ship Ballade, a 14-year-old Olofsson sailed around the world, including between Japan and South America. When he was 15, he disembarked from the boat and moved home to his mother, who had regained control of her life, and started working in a shop. The children were returned to her care and they moved to an apartment in Slätta Damm on Hisingen, Gothenburg. There he was a neighbor of future journalist Janne Josefsson. The family later moved to Köldgatan in Biskopsgården.

=== 1960s–1980s ===
For several petty crimes, sixteen-year-old Olofsson was placed in a behavioural institution for young offenders in 1963. Olofsson and two other boys escaped from the institution in August 1965 and entered the country estate of Swedish Prime Minister Tage Erlander at Harpsund, where they stole grapes, cucumbers, and tomatoes from the greenhouse. They fled when the gardener discovered them. Three months later, Olofsson assaulted two police officers in Eskilstuna. On 4 February 1966, he was sentenced to three years in prison; this was his third sentence and his first real prison sentence. In late 1966, he made his first escape from the prison at Tidaholm.

On 29 July 1966, police officers Ragnar Sandahl and Lennart Mathiasson responded to a burglary at a bicycle shop at Skjutsaregatan in Nyköping. Sandahl was shot and killed by Gunnar Norgren. The other burglar was Olofsson, who became a nationally known criminal. Norgren was arrested on 16 August that year in an apartment at Utåkersgatan 4 in Kålltorp, Gothenburg, and later confessed to the murder. The apartment belonged to a boyfriend of Olofsson's sister. Norgren gave up after the police fired several shots through the door to the apartment. Olofsson had escaped from the apartment before police entered and managed to elude them for two weeks but was eventually arrested on 25 August in Grimmaredsskogen in Västra Frölunda. Via telephone tapping, the police found out that Olofsson and his 20-year-old girlfriend were to meet at a special mountain hill in Grimmaredsskogen. Two policemen disguised as orienteers, Bertil Brosved and Ulf Högenberg, tried to arrest him at the same time as Olofsson pulled a pistol out of his waistband and fired two shots. Högenberg was hit in the shoulder. Olofsson was first sentenced to ten years in prison, but the Court of Appeal changed the sentence to eight years. Norgren was sentenced to 12 years, which was the most severe punishment a Swedish court could impose at that time.

On 4 February 1969, Olofsson escaped from Kumla Prison and fled to the Canary Islands. He then entered West Germany on a fake passport, flying to Frankfurt am Main, where he lived until he was arrested by the German police. He was escorted to the ferry in Travemünde where two Swedish police officers met him. He was then taken via Malmö back to the Kumla Prison. Two months before he was to be released, he escaped again, from Lingatan Prison, an open institution in Bohuslän. On 2 February 1973, he was arrested in the dining room of the Kurhotel in Ulricehamn. Police had received a tip from a cleaning lady who had seen a gun in his hotel room. At the time of his arrest, he had been on the run for seven months and had robbed a bank in Gothenburg. In May 1973, he was sentenced to six years in prison and transported to the Kalmar Prison.

==== Norrmalmstorg ====
In late 1973, Olofsson was incarcerated at the Norrköping Prison when bank robber Jan-Erik Olsson took hostages at Kreditbanken at Norrmalmstorg, Stockholm. Olsson demanded that Olofsson be allowed to come to the bank. Olofsson was brought to the bank, where he spent the next six days with the hostages. This event subsequently led to the creation of the phrase "Stockholm syndrome". Olofsson was convicted in the district court but was later acquitted in Svea Court of Appeal. He had, according to himself, acted to protect the hostages and had the silent consent of the police. He was taken back to prison to serve the remainder of his previous sentence. He sought a pardon from the government but the application was rejected along with his request to study law.

==== Fugitive, new sentences, and marriage ====
Olofsson escaped from the Norrköping prison on 20 March 1975. In April that year, he went into a bank in Copenhagen with a gun in each hand, fired a warning shot, and robbed the bank of SEK194,000. One month after the escape, Olofsson was in Marseille on the French Riviera. Together with a companion, he bought the sailboat Saga for 50,000 francs, and for three months they sailed around the Mediterranean. In August, they passed through the Strait of Gibraltar, out onto the Atlantic past the Azores. With the help of Inger and Mikael von Heijne from Djursholm, on their way home from the Caribbean, Olofsson got on the right course and finally reached Ireland. From there, they went to Denmark where Danish police came upon them. Olofsson escaped and it was not until January 1976 that the police caught up with him and managed to track him down at a crossroads outside Brussels. He managed to shoot himself free; on a train in Germany during this escape, he met 19-year-old Marijke Demuynck. On 24 March 1976, Olofsson robbed Handelsbanken on Östra Hamngatan 27 in Gothenburg of SEK 930,000 - at the time the largest robbery in Swedish criminal history. At the same time, he took two people hostage. He was arrested at 22:30, nine hours after the robbery, at hotel Gyllene Kärven in Herrljunga. SEK 230,000 was recovered during Olofsson‘s arrest; the rest was never found. For the record robbery, he was sentenced to eight years in prison, but three weeks after the verdict, in July 1976, he fled again, this time by driving a Scania truck through three prison gates at Norrköping Prison. Together with a number of fellow prisoners, they fled to a waiting getaway car. On 31 July 1976, he was arrested in Halmstad. On 12 August 1976, Olofsson married Belgian national Marijke Demuynck in Kumla Prison.

In 1979, while still in prison, Olofsson began studies in journalism at Stockholm University. He did an internship at the newspaper Arbetaren. During a leave on Midsummer's Eve in 1980, Olofsson got into a fight with fisherman Leif Sundin on Möja. The sentence was two and a half years for assault. His studies were interrupted by the verdict, but he eventually graduated in 1983. Olofsson was released in 1983; he then left Sweden with his wife and settled in her home country of Belgium. In November 1984, he was arrested in the port city of Blankenberge in Belgium, suspected of having tried to smuggle 25 kilograms of amphetamine into Sweden with the so-called Televerksligan ("Televerket Gang"). He was sentenced to ten years in prison for complicity in an aggravated felony drug offense.

=== 1990–2010s ===
==== Name and country change, convicted of drug smuggling ====
On 10 October 1991, Olofsson was released, changed his name to Daniel Demuynck, and moved to the Belgian countryside, 80 km outside Brussels. In July 1996, Olofsson was arrested outside a bank in Oslo when the police thought he was preparing a robbery. He was released after 24 hours. On a stormy November night, he was rescued by a sea rescue helicopter off the coast of Halland after his wooden boat was smashed against the rocks. A few weeks later, he was taken into custody for drunk driving in Stockholm. On 15 April 1998, he was arrested in Tenerife as the head of drug smuggling after being wanted internationally via Interpol for several months. He was extradited to Denmark and after a high-profile trial in Frederikssund, he was sentenced in 1999 to fourteen years in prison for smuggling 49 kilos of amphetamine into Denmark. It was then the most severe punishment for drug offenses ever handed out in Danish legal history. While in Denmark, he was held in the isolation ward at Vestre Prison in Copenhagen. He was released on parole on 9 May 2005.

==== New drug smuggling conviction and deportation to Belgium ====
On the evening of 19 July 2008, Olofsson and three other people were arrested next to Apelviken's campsite in Varberg. The police had him under surveillance for eight months and he was suspected of being the head in a large drug operation. At the same time, the police cracked down on a drug transport at Årsta partihallar in Stockholm. A total of six people were arrested in Stockholm and Varberg on suspicion of serious drug offenses. Olofsson was charged at the end of 2008 for trying to smuggle in 100 kilos of amphetamine and 76 kilos of cannabis from the Netherlands. The police of Östergötland had tracked down the drug smugglers through reconnaissance films and wiretapping since 2007. The trial began on 2 June 2009 and he was sentenced on 31 July 2009 to 14 years in prison, followed by life-time deportation, by the Linköping District Court for an aggravated drug offense and attempted aggravated drug offense. He was sentenced to nine years in prison for his drug dealing and was forced to serve another five years for continuing his crime following a previous conviction. When he returned to crime after his release in 2005, the district court had confiscated five years of his conditional release of seven years and thus Olofsson's sentence was in practice 14 years. On 7 December 2009, the prison sentence was upheld by Göta Court of Appeal.

Until the autumn of 2012, Olofsson was incarcerated at Saltvik Prison in Härnösand before he was moved to Kumla Prison. On 5 March 2013, Olofsson submitted his 24-page application for a new trial to the Supreme Court, where he, among other things, withdrew his involvement. The application was rejected in April 2013. As early as 2010, Olofsson applied for relocation to Belgium in the hope of a shorter sentence. The move from Kumla Prison in Sweden was delayed for several years and did not take place until the end of 2016 - then against his will - after Swedish and Belgian representatives agreed that he would be imprisoned for at least as long in Vorst Prison in Belgium. In February 2017, Olofsson turned 70 years old and was granted new Swedish citizenship. In October 2017, he was rejected in a Belgian court on his application for an ankle monitor. Olofsson demanded relocation back to Sweden. Belgium granted the application but in November 2017 Sweden rejected it.

==== Release ====
The decision to release Olofsson came after a negotiation on conditional release in Belgium at the end of May 2018. On 30 July 2018, Olofsson landed at Landvetter Airport outside Gothenburg, Sweden as a free man.

== Personal life, illness and death ==
On 7 July 1967, Olofsson became engaged to Madiorie Britmer in prison. He married Marijke Demuynck from Belgium in 1976; they occasionally lived in a large house in the Belgian countryside. The marriage with Marijke ended in 1999. He was the father of six children: the youngest son with his fiancée, three older sons with Marijke and two daughters from before his marriage.

Olofsson died in Arvika, Sweden, on 24 June 2025, aged 78, following a long period of ill health.

== Popular culture ==
The 1977 movie Clark, had Olofsson as co-writer on the script.

Folkhemsdesperadon (2001) is a documentary with an interview with Olofsson.

Norrmalmstorgsdramat inifrån (2003) is an interview with the bank-robber Jan-Erik Olsson, who demanded that Olofsson be allowed to come to the bank.

In the film Norrmalmstorg (2003), Olofsson is portrayed by Shanti Roney.

The podcast Criminal spoke with Olofsson about the Norrmalmstorg robbery in their episode "Hostage."

In January 2020, Sveriges Television aired the documentary Clark - en rövarhistoria. The documentary was criticized for portraying Olofsson like an idol, and because it had been produced by Alexander Eriksson, one of the convicted robbers from the Västberga helicopter robbery.

On 11 May 2020, Netflix announced Clark, a limited six-episode drama series about Clark Olofsson. The series, directed by Jonas Åkerlund, aired in May 2022. Olofsson is played by Bill Skarsgård.

== Bibliography ==
- Olofsson, Clark (1986). Rättvisans lotteri [The Lottery of Justice] (in Swedish). Stockholm: Prisma. ISBN 91-518-2030-7. SELIBR 7407420.
- Olofsson, Clark (2015). Vafan var det som hände? [What the Hell Happened?] (in Swedish). Stockholm: Upp med händerna i samarbete med Ordupplaget. ISBN 9789185785957. SELIBR 17921760.
