= BIJI =

Swedish-Kurdish musical duo

- Origin: Stockholm, Sweden
- Genres: Hip hop; Afrobeat; Kurdish music; Dance
- Years active: 2019–present
- Members: Robin Nazari; Maceo Frost

BIJI is a Swedish-Kurdish musical duo formed in 2019 by artist, actor, and poet Robin Nazari and director and music producer Maceo Frost. Based in Stockholm, the duo blends Kurdish and Western Asian musical traditions with hip hop, Afrobeat, Latin, and dance music, and has described its work as an effort to reframe global narratives around Kurdish culture and identity. The group's 2025 single "Zigidi" won Music Video of the Year at the Swedish Grammis and Best Music Video at the SXSW Film & TV Festival.

== History ==
=== Formation ===
BIJI was founded in 2019 by Nazari, a Kurdish-Swedish artist who had previously released three solo albums in the Swedish rap scene and appeared as an actor in the Netflix series Snabba Cash, and Frost, a Swedish director and producer born into a family associated with hip hop, skateboarding, and street dance. The duo has said the project grew out of a shared sense of responsibility toward Kurdish heritage, referencing historical restrictions on Kurdish language and cultural expression as a motivating factor.

=== "Zigidi" and international recognition ===
In May 2022, Nazari and Frost travelled to Kurdistan to shoot "Zigidi," the first BIJI music video filmed in the region. The video combines high-energy action sequences with documentary-style footage, following a fictional mission to deliver a car through the desert. It was produced by BWGTBLD, new—land, Knucklehead, and Diplomats. "Zigidi" won Best Music Video at the 2025 SXSW Film & TV Festival and Music Video of the Year at the 2025 Grammis.

=== Debut album and later work ===
BIJI released its debut album, BIJI, pt. 1, which the duo has framed as a tribute to Kurdistan and the Kurdish diaspora. As of early 2025, the duo were reported to be working on a second studio album and preparing a BIJI Newroz festival.

=== "Can Can Can" with Baxtyar Salih ===
BIJI released the single "Can Can Can" featuring Kurdish singer Baxtyar Salih, with an accompanying music video whose original concept and direction is credited to BIJI (Frost and Nazari). It was released through EMPIRE. The single marks a second collaboration between BIJI and Salih, following his earlier featured vocals on "Chopi" from BIJI, pt. 1.

== Members ==
- Robin Nazari – Kurdish-Swedish artist, actor, and poet; former solo rap artist; known for the role of Ari in Snabba Cash.
- Maceo Frost – Swedish director and music producer, named after James Brown's saxophonist; known for directing music videos, documentaries, and commercials for brands including IKEA, Gant, and H&M.

== Musical style ==
BIJI's music has been characterised as fusing Kurdish and Western Asian instrumentation and vocal traditions with hip hop, Afrobeat, Latin, and dance genres. Coverage of the group has highlighted its use of instruments such as violin, dahol, and zurna alongside contemporary production and synthesisers.

== Discography ==
=== Albums ===
- BIJI, pt. 1

=== Singles ===
- "Gold"
- "Zigidi" (2024)
- "Chopi" (2024, with Baxtyar Salih)
- "Can Can Can" (2026, with Baxtyar Salih)

== Awards ==
Year	Award	Category	Work	Result
2025	Grammis	Music Video of the Year	"Zigidi"	Won
2025	SXSW Film & TV Festival	Best Music Video	"Zigidi"	Won
