= PK-Banken =

Swedish bank

PK Banken or Post & Kreditbanken, "the Post and Credit Bank", was a Swedish bank formed through the merger of Kreditbanken and the nationally owned Postbanken in 1974. After the purchase of several regional banks, which included "Nordbanken" ("The Northern Bank"), the entire bank took on that name. Nordbanken merged with the Finnish bank Merita in 1998 to form Merita-Nordbanken. Merita-Nordbanken merged in 2000 with the Danish Unibank to become Nordic Baltic Holding before acquiring the Norwegian Kreditkassen, and subsequently adopting the new Nordea brand in 2001.

== See also ==
- List of banks in Sweden
