= Bengt Fahlström =

Swedish journalist and television presenter (1938–2017)

- Born: August 28, 1938
- Died: February 23, 2017 (aged 78)
- Occupations: Journalist, television presenter
- Employer: SVT
- Known for: Presenter of Barnjournalen (1972–1988)
- Notable work: Barnjournalen
- Awards: Stora Journalistpriset (1979)

Bengt Fahlström (28 August 1938 – 23 February 2017) was a Swedish journalist and television presenter, he presented Barnjournalen at SVT between 1972 and 1988. In 1979, he was awarded the Stora Journalistpriset for his work with the show.
