= Louis Bernard Bonjean =

French jurist (1804–1871)

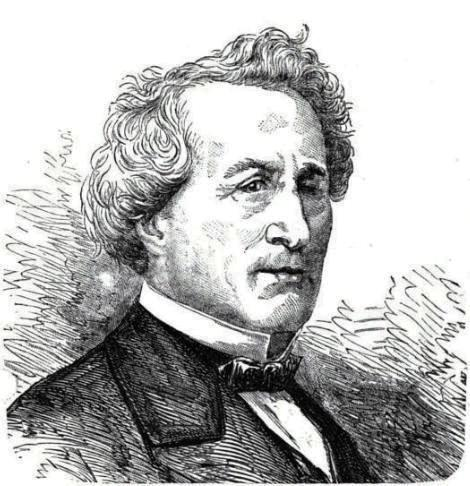
- Bonjean from G. Martiny de Riez, Histoire illustrée de la guerre civile à Paris, Laon, Deneuville, 1871
- Born: 4 December 1804; Valence, Drôme, France
- Died: 24 May 1871 (aged 66); Paris, France
- Occupation: Jurist

Louis Bernard Bonjean (4 December 1804 – 24 May 1871) was a French jurist who was a Senator under Napoleon III. He was a prolific author. During the Paris Commune he was taken prisoner and later shot.

== Early years ==
Bonjean was born in Valence, Drôme, on 4 December 1804. His family was from Savoy. He studied law in Paris, and received a doctorate in 1830. He participated in the July 1830 revolution. He had planned to make a career in legal education, but gave up this ambition after competing unsuccessfully to become a professor. In 1838, he obtained a position as an advocate for the King's Counsel and for the Court of Cassation. He gained a reputation from various works that he published on jurisprudence.

== Politician ==
Bonjean entered politics in 1848 and was elected as representative for Drôme on a Republican platform on 23 April 1848. However, he took his place on the right of the House and joined the conservative and Catholic majority. On 13 May 1849, he again ran for election for Drôme, and in March 1850 ran in a by-election in Paris, but did not succeed in either attempt. However, he remained involved in politics. At the start of 1851 the President gave him the post of Minister of Agriculture and Commerce, which he held for two weeks from 9 to 24 January. He supported the coup of December 1851, and was one of the members of the Council of State of 1852, presiding over the Interior section.

Bonjean then entered the imperial judiciary. On 16 February 1855, he was named a senator. Although conservative, he sometimes leaned towards a more liberal position and came into conflict with the majority. On 14 August 1862, he was made a Grand Officer of the Legion of Honour. He was made first president of the Court of Riom in 1863 and President of Chamber at the Court of Cassation in 1865. When the Siege of Paris began on 4 September 1870 he remained in Paris and helped with the defense as a member of the National Guard. The Paris Commune took him hostage and imprisoned him in Mazas Prison. He was among those shot at La Roquette by the troops of the Commune on 24 May 1871.

== Selected works ==
Louis Bernard Bonjean was a prolific author, and also acted as an editor and translator. Selected works:

- De la donation entre vifs 56 p. 1837 Paris impr. Terzuolo
- Mémoire à consulter pour les colons de la Guyane française spoliés par la violation de la capitulation du 12 janvier 1809 avec le Portugal In-8°, 24 p. 1839 Paris impr. de Béthune et Plon
- Traité des actions, ou Exposition historique de l'organisation judiciaire et de la procédure civile chez les Romains 2 vol. in-8° 1841-1845 Paris Videcoq
- De la Propriété et de la prescriptibilité des îles du Rhin, extrait de la "Revue étrangère et française de législation" In-8°, 46 p. 1843 Paris Joubert
- Chrestomathie, ou Choix de textes pour un cours élémentaire du droit privé des Romains In-8°, CXVI-484 p. 1843 Paris Videcoq et fils
- De l'Inconstitutionnalité de la juridiction militaire en Algérie à l'égard des citoyens français non militaires In-8°, 32 p. 1843 Paris impr. de Rignoux
- Socialisme et sens commun, 68 p. May 1849 Paris Vve Le Normant
- Conservation des oiseaux, leur utilité pour l'agriculture 56 p. 1862 Tarbes impr. de Telmon
- Du Pouvoir temporel de la papauté In-8°, 533 p. 1862 Paris impr. de C. Lahure
- Cour impériale de Riom 7 Mai 1863 In-8°, 63 p. Riom, U. Jouvet
- Les Allopathes et les homéopathes devant le Sénat, discours de MM. Dumas, Bonjean et Dupin. Séance du 1er juillet 1865, 125 p. 1865 Paris Garnier frères
