= Jan-Erik Olsson =

Retired Swedish criminal (born 1941)

- Born: 16 April 1941 (age 85); Bjuv, Sweden
- Other name: Janne Olsson
- Known for: Norrmalmstorg robbery

Jan-Erik "Janne" Olsson (born 16 April 1941) is a Swedish criminal, born and raised in Ekeby, outside Helsingborg. He was the main culprit in the 1973 Norrmalmstorg robbery in Stockholm, for which the term Stockholm syndrome was named.

== Kalmar Prison ==
Olsson met the known criminal Clark Olofsson at the Swedish correctional facility in Kalmar, and they became friends. Olsson was fascinated by Clark Olofsson's criminal past as a bank robber. After Olsson later disappeared during a furlough, he carried out a failed rescue attempt of Clark Olofsson on 7 January 1973, attempting to blow up the wall with dynamite that he had smuggled in earlier. Olsson sat in a car outside during the attempt. However, Olofsson failed to detonate the dynamite, which caused the rescue attempt to fail.

== Norrmalmstorg robbery ==
Olsson was the main culprit at the Norrmalmstorg robbery in Stockholm on 23–28 August 1973. On 23 August 1973, he was inside the Pressbyrån store in central Stockholm, where he masked himself. He then entered Kreditbanken with a submachine gun under his jacket and took four people hostage, demanding that Clark Olofsson be brought to him along with 3 million Swedish krona. Olofsson was a repeat offender who had committed several armed robberies and acts of violence, the first at the age of 16. During the robbery, Olsson fired multiple times at the police, injuring one officer in the hand and another in the face and arms. He spoke twice with Swedish Prime Minister Olof Palme. The robbery ended on 28 August after the police deployed gas. Olsson, as well as the hostages and Clark Olofsson, all survived unharmed. Olsson was sentenced to ten years in prison; he was released in 1980.

Since the robbery, Olsson has not been convicted of any other crimes. He lived in Thailand for 15 years with his wife and son, where they ran a supermarket. He has since returned to Helsingborg, where he has operated an automobile repair shop, and is now retired.

== Bibliography ==
- Olsson, Janne (2009). Stockholmssyndromet. Stockholm: Telegram Bokförlag AB. ISBN 978-91-86183-04-2.
