= Stockholm syndrome =

Contested psychological condition

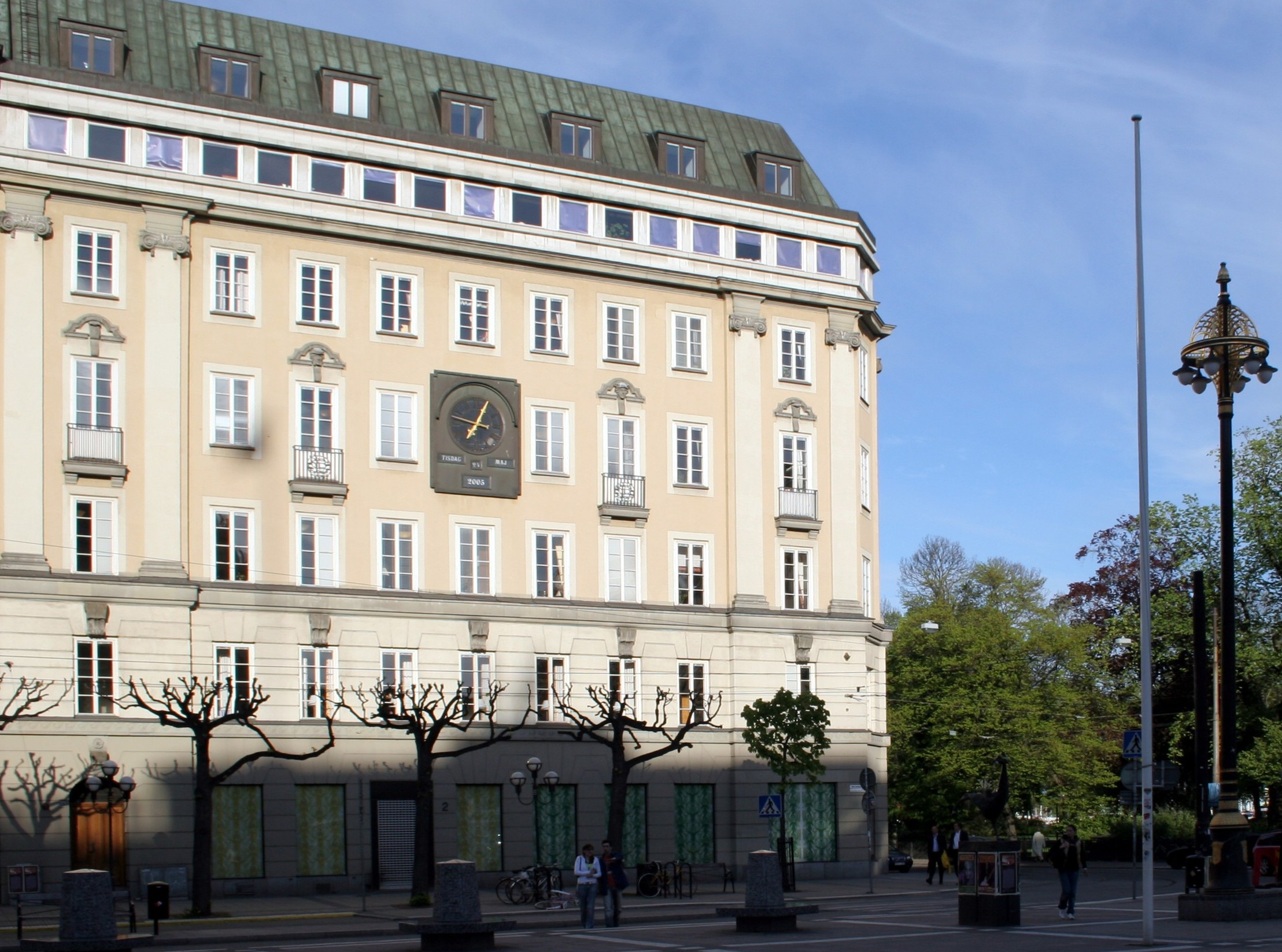
Former Kreditbanken building in Stockholm, Sweden, the location of the 1973 Norrmalmstorg robbery (photographed in 2005)

Stockholm syndrome is a disputed disorder in pop psychology characterized by the tendency of hostages to develop a psychological bond with their captors. It is named after an attempted bank robbery in 1973, in Stockholm.

Despite its prominence in popular culture, as of 2012 Stockholm syndrome had not been included in any version of the United States authoritative guide for diagnosis of psychiatric conditions, the Diagnostic and Statistical Manual of Mental Disorders (DSM), and psychologists generally consider evidence for the condition to be dubious or nonexistent. Many famous examples of Stockholm syndrome are either partly or entirely fabricated, including many details of the 1973 bank robbery that gives the syndrome its name.

== Background ==
In 1973, Jan-Erik Olsson, a convict on parole, took four employees (three women and one man) hostage during a failed bank robbery of Kreditbanken, one of the largest banks in Stockholm. He negotiated for his friend Clark Olofsson to be released from prison to assist him. They held the hostages captive for six days (23–28 August) in one of the bank vaults.

Nils Bejerot, a Swedish criminologist and psychiatrist, invented the term after the Stockholm police asked him for assistance with analyzing the victims' reactions to the robbery and their status as hostages. Bejerot never met, spoke to, or corresponded with the hostages during or after the incident, yet diagnosed them with a condition he invented. Bejerot, speaking on a news cast after the captives' release, described the hostages' reactions as a result of being brainwashed by their captors. He called it Norrmalmstorgssyndromet (after Norrmalmstorg Square, where the attempted robbery took place), meaning "The Norrmalm Square syndrome"; it later became known outside Sweden as Stockholm syndrome. In 1980, psychiatrist Frank Ochberg wrote about the status of the hostages held in the American embassy in Tehran and suggested that transference might aid the management of hostage situations.

According to accounts by Kristin Enmark, one of the hostages, the authorities were careless, and their initial approach to the robbers nearly compromised the hostages' safety. Enmark criticized Sweden's prime minister, Olof Palme, for endangering their lives. Palme believed that if Olsson saw one of his close relatives, he might be willing to surrender the hostages; however, the police made a careless mistake. They misidentified Olsson and sent a 16-year-old boy who was unrelated into the bank. This caused confusion and resulted in Olsson firing rounds at the boy, who barely escaped. Olsson became much more agitated in general. After that, Enmark and the other three hostages were fearful that they were just as likely to be killed by police incompetence as by the robbers. Ultimately, Enmark explained she was more afraid of the police, whose attitude seemed to be a much larger, direct threat to her life than the robbers. Enmark spent decades maintaining that she had no affinity for her captors; she only did what it took to stay alive during the ordeal.

Olsson later said in an interview that he could have easily killed the hostages in the beginning, but over time it became more difficult, as he developed an emotional bond with them:

They made it hard to kill. They made us go on living together day after day, like goats, in that filth. There was nothing to do but get to know each other.

=== Patty Hearst ===
Patty Hearst, the granddaughter of publisher William Randolph Hearst, was taken and held hostage by the Symbionese Liberation Army, "an urban guerrilla group", in 1974. She was recorded denouncing her family as well as the police using her new name, "Tania", and was later seen working with the SLA to rob banks in San Francisco. She publicly asserted her "sympathetic feelings" toward the SLA and their pursuits as well. After her 1975 arrest, pleading Stockholm syndrome (although the term was not used yet, due to the recency of the event) was inadequate as a defense in court, much to the chagrin of her defense lawyer F. Lee Bailey. Her seven-year prison sentence was later commuted, and she was eventually pardoned by President Bill Clinton, who was informed that she was not acting of her own free will.

== Symptoms and behaviors ==
Stockholm syndrome is paradoxical because the sympathetic sentiments that captives might feel towards their captors are the opposite of the fear which an onlooker might feel towards the captors.

Stockholm Syndrome is identified by the separate or combined presence of the following:

- negative feelings by hostages toward law enforcement and other authorities;
- positive feelings from hostages toward their captor;
- positive feelings reciprocated by captor toward the hostages.

It is more likely to occur if the hostages are kept together and are not physically abused by their captor.

=== Diagnostic and Statistical Manual (DSM 5, 2013) ===
The DSM-5 is widely used as the "classification system for psychological disorders" by the American Psychiatric Association. Stockholm syndrome had not been included in the manual as of 2012, as many believe it falls under trauma bonding or post-traumatic stress disorder (PTSD). As of 2026, the effect remained absent in "the main diagnostic manuals used internationally by psychiatrists".

== Assessment ==
=== Robbins and Anthony (1982) ===
Robbins and Anthony, who had historically studied a condition similar to Stockholm syndrome, known as destructive cult disorder, observed in their 1982 study that the 1970s were rich with apprehension surrounding the potential risks of brainwashing. They assert that media attention to brainwashing during this time resulted in the fluid reception of Stockholm syndrome as a psychological condition.

=== FBI law enforcement bulletin (1999) ===
A 1999 report by the FBI containing more than 1,200 hostage incidents found that 8% of kidnapping victims showed signs of Stockholm syndrome. When victims who showed only negative feelings toward the law enforcement personnel are excluded, the percentage decreases to 5%. A survey of 600 police agencies in 1989, performed by the FBI and the University of Vermont, found not a single case when emotional involvement between the victim and the kidnapper interfered with or jeopardized an assault. In short, this database provides empirical support that the Stockholm syndrome remains a rare occurrence. The sensational nature of dramatic cases causes the public to perceive this phenomenon as the rule rather than the exception. The bulletin concludes that, although depicted in fiction and movies and often referred to by the news media, the phenomenon actually occurs rarely. Therefore, crisis negotiators should place the Stockholm syndrome in proper perspective.

=== Namnyak et al. (2008) ===
A research group led by Namnyak has found that although there is vast media coverage of Stockholm syndrome, there has not been much research into the phenomenon. What little research has been done is often contradictory and does not always agree on what Stockholm syndrome is. The term has grown beyond kidnappings to all definitions of abuse. It stated that there is no clear definition of symptoms to diagnose the syndrome.

=== Allan Wade (2015) ===
At the 'Mind The Gap' Conference in 2015, Dr. Allan Wade presented "Rethinking Stockholm Syndrome" in which he discussed his recent conversations with Kristin Enmark and presented original source material which gives a contextual view of the hostage-taking and the notion of "Stockholm Syndrome." He posited that "Stockholm Syndrome" and related ideas such as "traumatic bonding", "learned helplessness", "battered women's syndrome", "internalized oppression", and "identification with the aggressor/oppressor" shift the focus away from actual events in context, to invented pathologies in the minds of victims, particularly women. "Stockholm Syndrome" can be seen as one of many concepts used to silence individuals who, as victims, speak publicly about negative social (i.e., institutional) responses. He proposed that “Stockholm Syndrome” as an accepted “clinical” reality reveals a style of theorizing the oppressed as being submissive and deficient, in need of instruction and correction, and participants in their own oppression. In 2024, Allan Wade and his colleague Cathy Richardson recorded a video "The Myth of Stockholm Syndrome".

=== Jess Hill (2019) ===
In her 2019 treatise on domestic violence See What You Made Me Do, Australian journalist Jess Hill described the syndrome as a "dubious pathology with no diagnostic criteria", and stated that it is "riddled with misogyny and founded on a lie"; she also noted that a 2008 literature review revealed "most diagnoses [of Stockholm syndrome] are made by the media, not by psychologists or psychiatrists." In particular, Hill's analysis revealed that Stockholm authorities responded to the robbery in a way that put the hostages at greater risk from the police than from their captors (hostage Kristin Enmark, who during the siege was granted a telephone call with Swedish Prime Minister Olof Palme, reported that Palme told her that the government would not negotiate with criminals); as well, she observed that Bejerot's diagnosis of Enmark was made without ever having spoken to her.

== Proposed related conditions ==
=== Lima syndrome ===
An inversion of Stockholm syndrome, termed Lima syndrome, has been proposed, in which abductors develop sympathy for their hostages. An abductor may also have second thoughts or experience empathy towards their victims. Lima syndrome was named after an abduction at the Japanese embassy in Lima, Peru, in 1996, when members of a militant movement took hostage hundreds of people attending a party at the official residence of Japan's ambassador.

Lima syndrome is poorly understood, as the main example for research on this variation came from the Japanese embassy hostage crisis in Lima. Two main factors observed in the evaluation were that spending time with the captives may have strengthened the bonds between the captor and captive, however, this had little basis as the majority of captives were released earlier on. Establishing a friendly rapport with a captor could contribute to a positive bond, as most of the captives in this situation were high-level diplomats who were well-versed in their communication skills.

=== London syndrome ===
London syndrome is conjectured to be the situation where hostages arouse the kidnappers' antipathy by defying them or arguing with them. The name London syndrome comes from the 1980 siege of the Iranian Embassy in London, in which 26 hostages were taken. This prompted a special forces attack, during which they rescued all but one of the remaining hostages and killed five of the six captors. The one hostage who was killed was the Iranian cultural attache, who was the particular focus of the situation to begin with.

== See also ==
- Attachment theory
- Brainwashing
- Codependency
- Cognitive dissonance
- Complex post-traumatic stress disorder
- Identification with the Aggressor
- Learned helplessness
- Traumatic bonding
- Turkeys voting for Christmas
- Uncle Tom syndrome
