= Kreditbanken =

Danish bank (1928–1984)

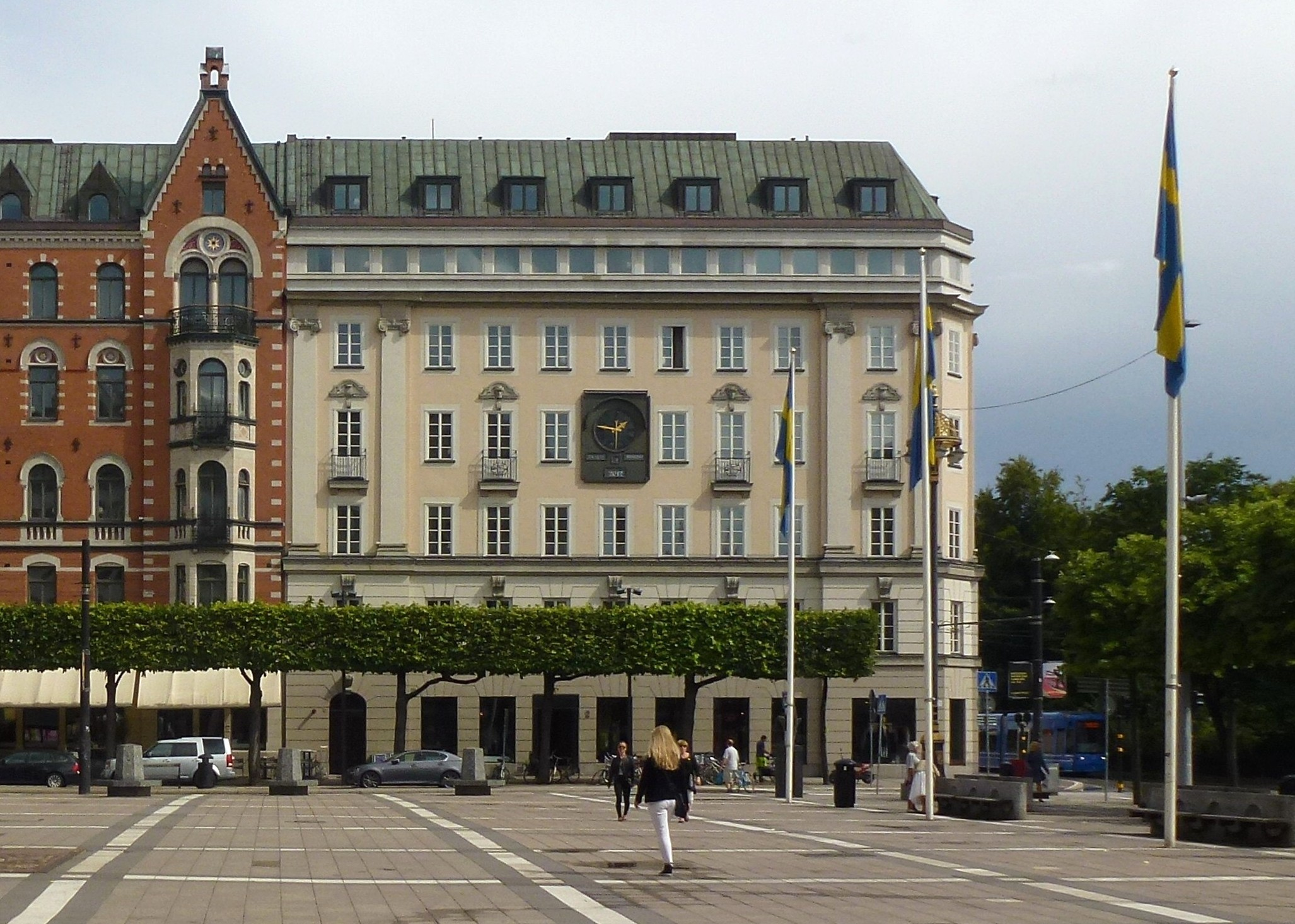
Kreditbanken Norrmalmstorg 2012

Kreditbanken (also known as Sveriges Kreditbank) was a former state-owned bank that was based in Stockholm, Sweden. Founded in 1923 as Jordbrukarbanken, it was merged with the Post Bank to form PK-Banken in 1974. PK-Banken purchased Nordbanken in 1980, and it later changed its name to Nordbanken, which in turn became part of Nordea.

The Kreditbanken is notable in that the condition known as Stockholm syndrome was named after the Norrmalmstorg robbery, which took place here.

Nobis Hotel Stockholm occupies the northern end of the building.

== See also ==
- List of banks in Sweden
