= Skarsgård =

Skarsgård (Swedish: [ˈskɑ̌ːʂɡoːɖ]) is a surname. Notable people with the surname include:

== Skarsgård acting family ==
- Stellan Skarsgård (born 1951), Swedish actor. Father of Alexander, Bill, Gustaf, Kolbjörn, and Valter.
  - Alexander Skarsgård (born 1976), Swedish actor
  - Bill Skarsgård (born 1990), Swedish actor
  - Gustaf Skarsgård (born 1980), Swedish actor
  - Kolbjörn Skarsgård (born 2012), Swedish actor
  - Valter Skarsgård (born 1995), Swedish actor

== Other individuals ==
- Susan Skarsgard (born 1954), American graphic designer and calligrapher
