= Ewert Ljusberg =

Swedish entertainer (1945–2021)

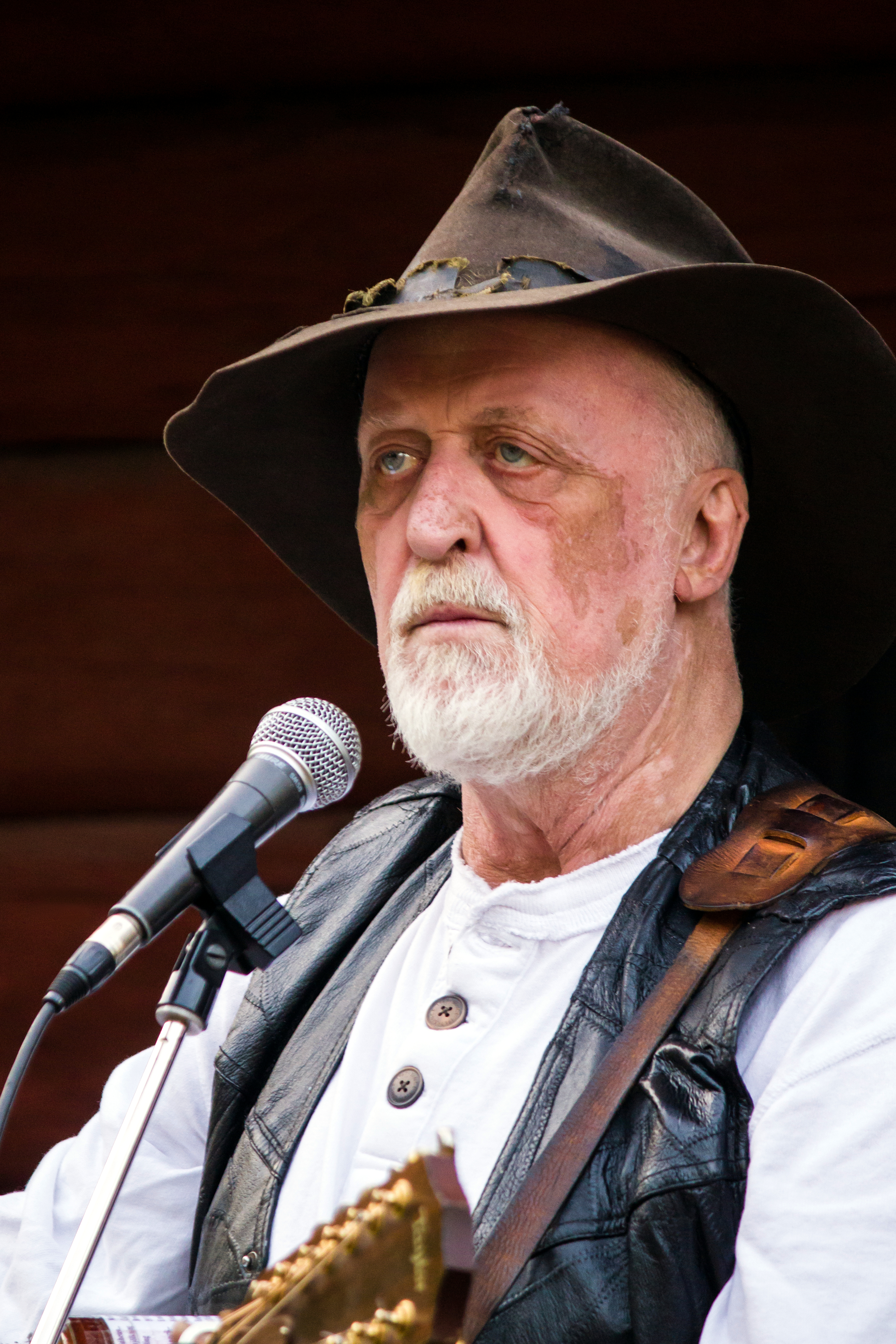

President of the Republic of Jamtland
- In office 1989–2021
- Preceded by: Moltas Erikson
- Succeeded by: Eva Röse

Personal details
- Born: Karl Ewert Alvar Ljusberg; 7 May 1945 Hede, Sweden
- Died: 1 October 2021 (aged 76) Härjedalen, Sweden

Karl Ewert Alvar Ljusberg (7 May 1945 – 1 October 2021) was a Swedish troubadour, ballad singer, entertainer, and the fictitious Republic of Jamtland's president from 1989 until his death. He lived in Hällekis.

== Career ==
During his career as a professional artist from 1971 he collaborated with many prominent ballad singers, for example Sid Jansson, Cornelis Vreeswijk, and Billey Shamrock. He also acted in the National Swedish Touring Theatre's Joe Hill and in the musical Jesus Christ Superstar. He created several records throughout the years, from Goknul 1972 to Tack för kaffet 2003. Ljusberg also created records with Bengt Sändh, Iggesundsgänget, and his brother Arne Ljusberg. Most of his fame among the TV-audience came from his part as the storyteller in Har du hört den förut? (1983–1996) together with Margareta Kjellberg. Many of his texts are written in härjedalska (an umbrella term for northern dialects and languages spoken in Härjedalen).

Ewert Ljusberg was assigned president of Republic of Jamtland in 1989. He performed a show annually at the festival Storsjöyran in Östersund, where he gave a speech on Saturday night at midnight. Ljusberg gave, as president, birth to Jamtelagen, a counterpart to Jantelagen.

We'll push the racists and homo-haters back, not with iron pipes and knives, but the worst thing they know: love and respect.

— Ewert Ljusberg, presidential speech of August 2014

== Discography ==
- 1972 – Goknul!
- 1975 – Och inte kallar jag det att gråta...
- 1977 – Possokongro (with Iggesundsgänget)
- 1978 – Huvva för e' hippä!'
- 1979 – U' hunnsmjôlsposson (with Arne Ljusberg)
- 1981 – Guds bästa barn
- 1983 – Skamgrepp (with Bengt Sändh)
- 1984 – Lån' mä tänder (with Arne Ljusberg)
- 1985 – Spökmatrosens sånger
- 1986 – Splitternya visor – Nils Ferlin (with Bernt Johansson)
- 1992 – Spotlight – Ewert Ljusberg
- 1995 – Raw Roots (with Torgny "Kingen" Karlsson)
- 1998 – Boca Louca Nights (recorded in São Tomé)
- 2003 – Tack för kaffet
- 2006 – Ewert – livs levande
- 2006 – Ljusbergs väg
- 2008 – Songs for Beauties and Beasts
- 2019 – Bär mig i ditt hjärta

== Filmography ==
- 1975 – Ställ krav på din arbetsmiljö!
- 2002 – Lilo & Stitch (in Swedish)
- 2018 – Tror du jag ljuger (TV-series)

== Prizes and awards ==
- 1989 – Fred Åkerström grant
- 2003 – Nils Ferlin-Sällskapets troubadour prize
- 2006 – Cornelis Vreeswijk grant
- 2008 – Ulf Peder Olrog grant
