= History of Östersund =

Östersund is a Swedish city which is a relatively young city in Scandinavia, being founded as late as 1786 after several Swedish attempts to found and charter a city in Jämtland, a previously Norwegian province.

== Older history ==
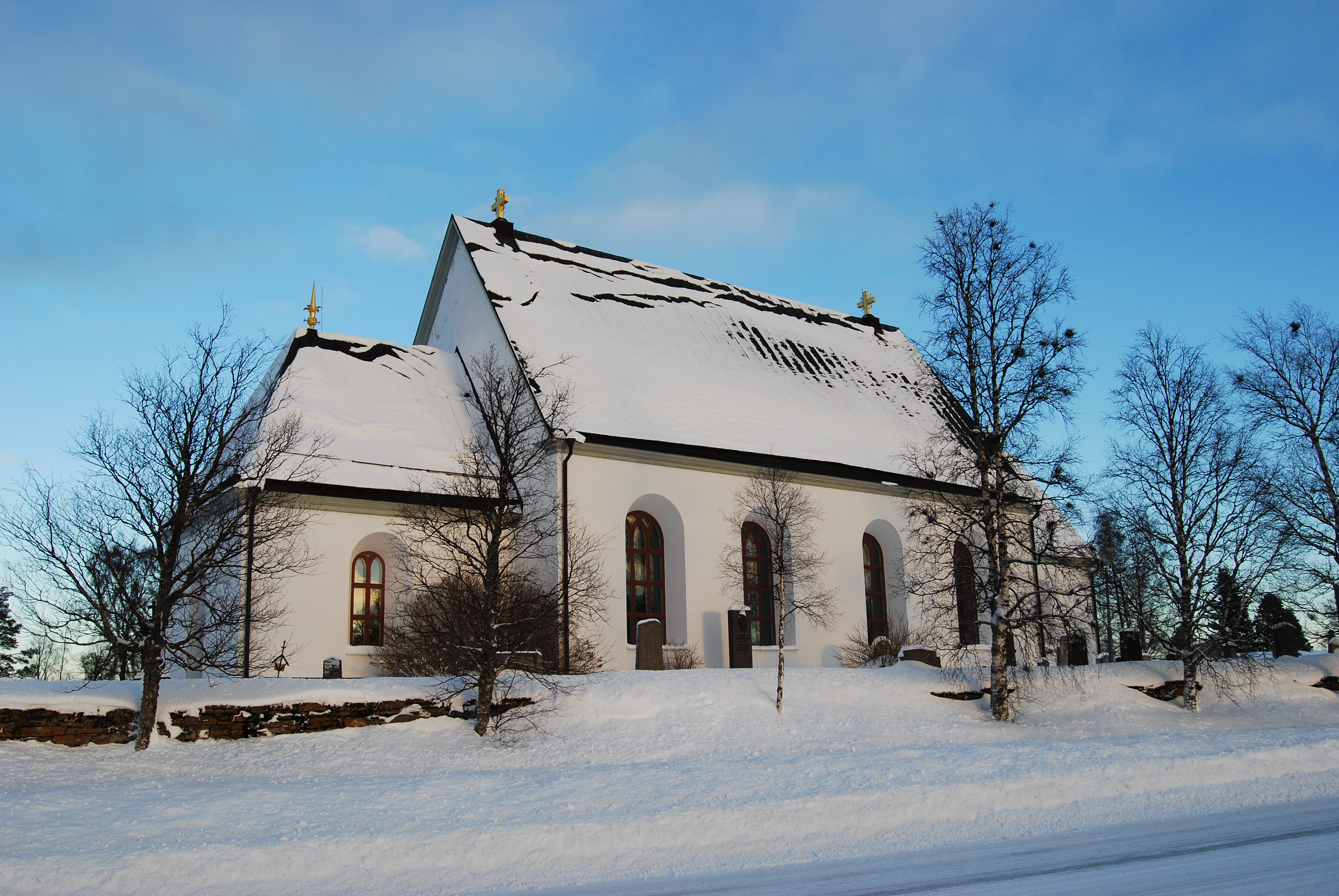
The Frösö church was built at the end of 12th century or in the beginning of the 13th century. Frösön is considered by many as the city's cradle, since the island was Jämtlands centre for centuries.

Since the 16th century Sweden has sought to expand its influence over Jämtland, which at the time still was a part of Norway, or more precisely Denmark-Norway: first politically, with no substantial result, and later economically. Cities were established along the Norrlandic coast in order to control trade, Jämtland's faring trade included. Härnösand was the first city established in 1585, later followed by Sundsvall in 1621. These cities were tiny and had little success dealing with the deeply rooted resistance towards the state's interest in controlling trade and the connection between Trøndelag and Jämtland.

Plans regarding the foundation of a Swedish city or köping (market town, "Chipping") in Jämtland existed amongst governmental officials after the province was ceded from Denmark-Norway in 1645. Queen Christina demanded the establishment of a sconce on Andersön shortly after the province became Swedish; this sconce would together with Frösö sconce secure Swedish control of Jämtland. Christina's intention was to locate the "Jamts' city" within this fortification. In order to construct the sconce the local inhabitants were coerced into forced labour 1651 but due to protests and lack of capital, the project was ended in 1654. Shortly afterwards there was a major revolt against the Swedish governance of Jämtland in Storsjöbygden; after the Dano-Norwegian Jämtland campaign in 1677 where the Jamts actively aided their "real" countrymen, saw them as liberators and fought the Swedes, all plans were regarding a Swedish city in Jämtland were put on hold.

In 1758 the plans were brought back up through an initiative from a civilian, though the authorities saw no need for a city in Jämtland. The proposition did, however, initiate a new debate whether or not a city was to be established in Jämtland. The aforementioned Norrlandic cities demanded it so that the faring traditions and the lucrative cross-country border trade conducted by Jamts in Norway across Kölen, the Scandinavian Mountains, was ended. The Jamts were known to neglect agriculture and instead undertake long trading journeys all over Scandinavia to various markets. With a city in Jämtland this could finally end and the city would be able to secure the transportation of goods, which usually was very scarce, to the coast. From a military perspective, a foundation of a city in Jämtland was favorable, given that Sweden no longer was a power to be reckoned with in Northern Europe.

== Foundation of Östersund ==
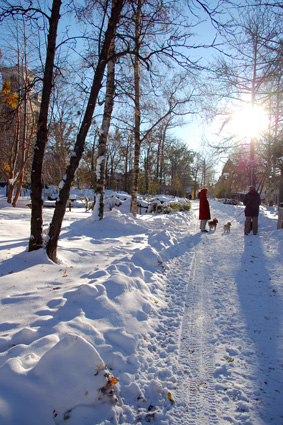
Kyrkparken next to Gamla Kyrkan "the old church" in central Östersund, this church was the first church in Östersund. When the houses were smaller it dominated the cityscape.

Östersund was founded and given its charter by King Gustav III of Sweden in 1786, shortly after the outskirts of the Odensala farmers' lands were bought for the purpose.

The only things actually located in the area at the time were the main road and the bridge to Frösön, the then mercantile and administrative centre of Jämtland. The trade in Jämtland could not be prevented from the Norrlandic coast. All trade restrictions such as border controls, punishments, trade prohibition and tariffs were unsatisfying for the Swedish authorities. The Jamts were too cunning and some people claim that the Jamtish signature expression bällt du luur'n? ('were you able to trick him?') derives from the Jamtish attempts to trick the Swedish border guard in order to avoid paying duty on merchandise brought back from Norway. This development was not unique to Sweden; it occurred throughout the Nordic countries, where the cities Tampere, Kuopio and Kaskinen were founded in present-day Finland. Though Östersund is, as stated in the beginning, the only city in today's Sweden founded and chartered in the 18th century. In Denmark-Norway, Reykjavík was founded the same year as Östersund, in Iceland. Östersund was upon its foundation freed from taxes for a period of 20 years and completely liberated from trade regulations and guild order.

The state tried to persuade the Jamtish traders on Frösön to migrate to the new city but they had no intentions of leaving such a rich parish with the fertile soils Frösön consisted of in favor of the swamp and marshes across the strait. During its first 50 years the city's population only grew by an average of eight people per year. The city became the county seat of the newly founded county consisting of the provinces Jämtland and Härjedalen in 1810, and a county council was established. Though, Östersund remained a de facto farming village with fewer than 400 inhabitants in 1820. The 1840s were slightly better when Jemtlands Tidning (Jämtland's first newspaper) was established, the first church was inaugurated, Frösö Trivial School was located to the city and a general hospital was built. An upswing occurred in the 1850s and 1860s, as trade was liberalized and the logging industry developed.

== The city of Good Templars ==
It took the construction of the railroad in 1879 for Östersund to become a real city and actually gain the status of Jämtland's centre, at Frösön's expense. Thanks to the "farmer chieftain" Nils Larson i Tullus, the railroad came to pass through the city itself instead of outside it, as planned. The railway from coast to coast across the then-union between Sweden and Norway was finished in 1882, connecting Östersund more closely to Trondheim and Sundsvall. Östersund then came to grow faster than any other Swedish city. After ten years it had passed 20 Swedish cities in population. The city attracted immigrants, a majority from the Jamtish countryside though still with a high number of settlers from southern Sweden.

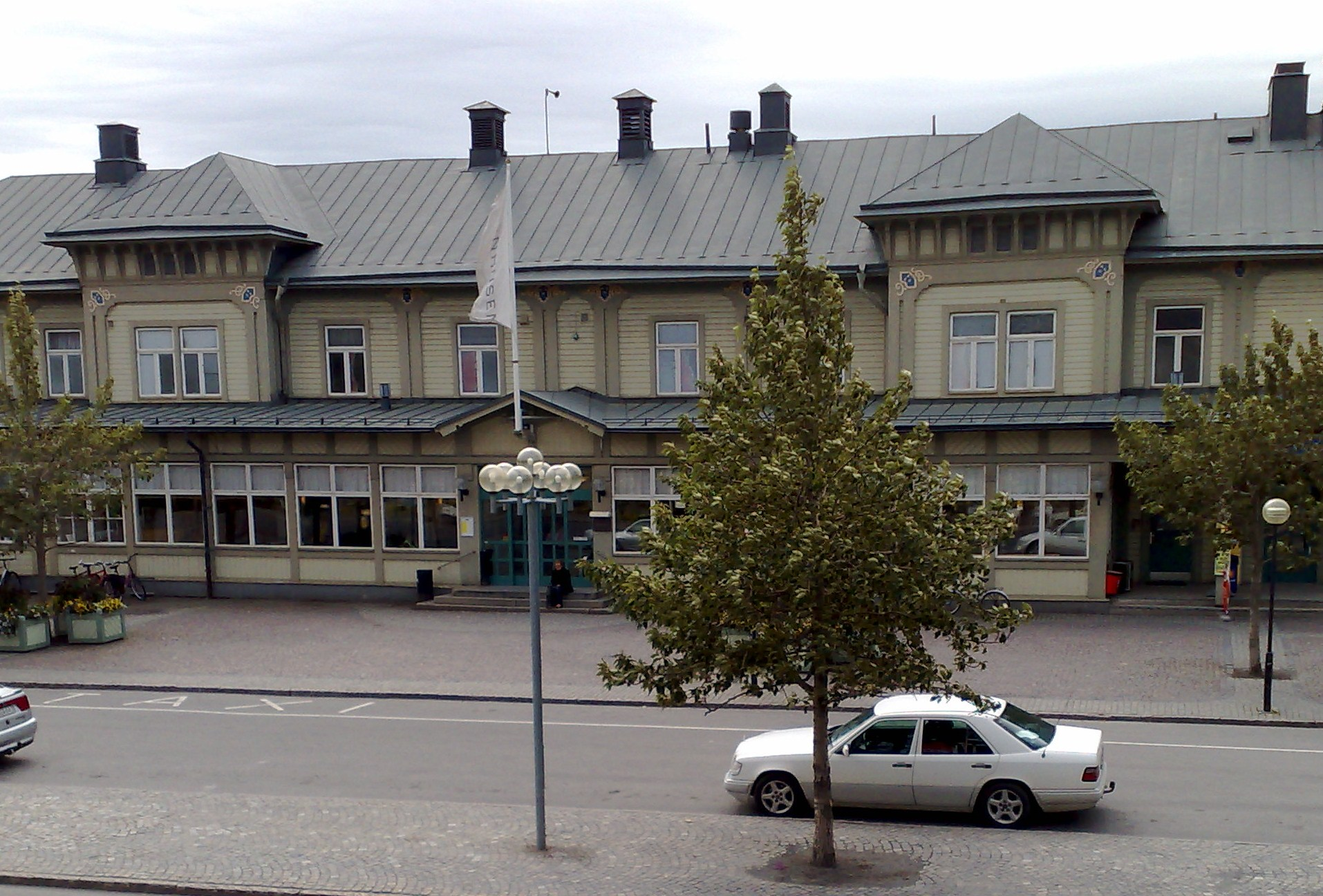
Without the railroad from coast to coast Östersund probably would not have been much of a city today. This railway station was built in 1879.

Along with the settlers came new influences to Jämtland and the province entered the popular movement age forcefully. In comparison with the rest of Sweden, the popular movements in Östersund were unusually dynamic. In Jämtland and Härjedalen the free-minded Good Templar movement (a part of the temperance movement) came to dominate completely. It was preceded by the free church movement that challenged the city's establishment with the creation of a missionary house and a Baptist chapel.

The third large popular movement, the labour movement, was greatly hampered by the free-minded temperance movement but also become somewhat prominent in the city, given that May first demonstrations were held as early as 1890.

The first temperance lounge in Östersund was established in 1882; after half a year the numbers of lounges had grown to six. In 1883, 700 of the city's total population of 3,000 were organized Good Templars. The rapid success the movement had gained created a unique enthusiasm and the movement came to encompass every part of society. The movement arranged its own weddings, and Christmas markets, entertainment establishments, coffeehouses, banks, a social insurance agency, and library were founded by the movement. Though the greatest symbol of the movements grandeur was the Order House constructed 1885 in the city, Östersunds-Goodtemplars-Ordenshus. When one of the most prominent leaders, Joseph Malins, visited the city he announced that it was the world's largest order house.

Östersund was the Good Templar city. The year after, when the city celebrated its 100th anniversary, the Good Templar and newspaper proprietor Johan Lindström Saxon looked forward and prophesied the fast-growing city as the new capital of Sweden-Norway for the city's 200th anniversary (Östersund did not achieve this status, as the union was abolished in 1905).

Jämtland with Östersund as its centre became the temperance movement's strongest foothold in the world, in relation to the population. At the same time Östersund became the trading centre of Jämtland with the ancient market Gregorie market as the highlight. Sweden received its freedom of trade in 1864 and the city's trade exploded and grew sevenfold from the early 1870s until 1910. In 1886, 30 per cent of the population in Östersund were tradesmen (twice as high as the national average); remarkably, 45 per cent of the tradesmen at the time were female. Ironically, it was not until the establishment of the railroad and with the liberalization of trade that the city actually fulfilled its purpose and the faring traditions in Jämtland ended.

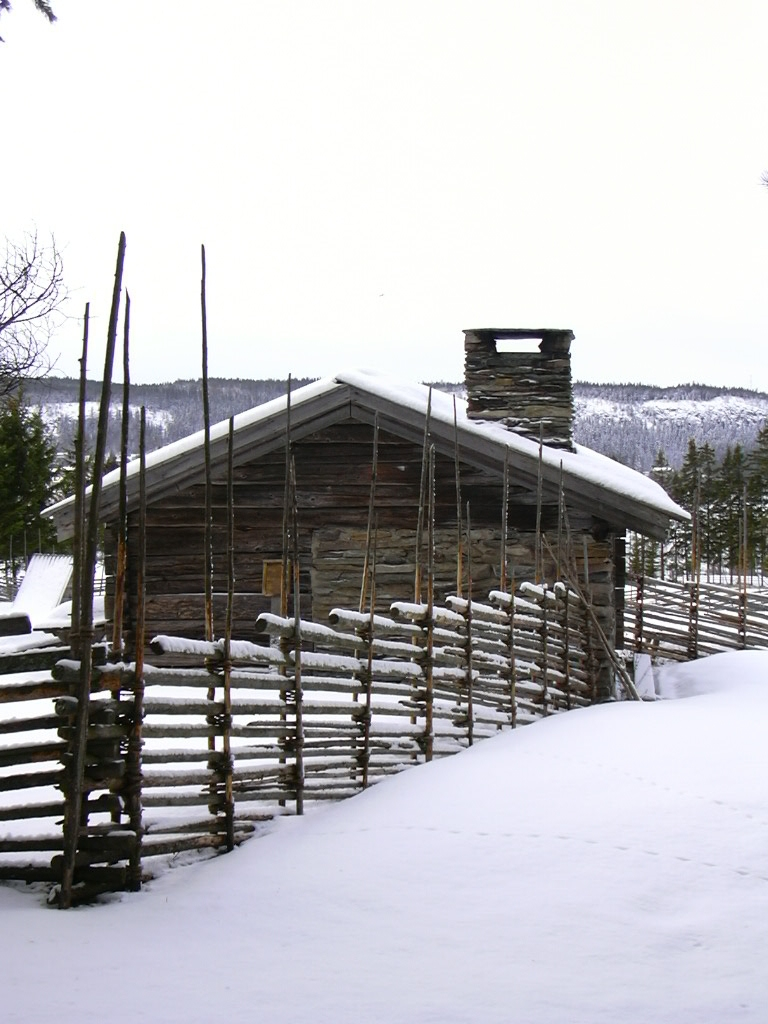
A Jamtish house behind a traditional split-rail fence at Jamtli History Land in Östersund

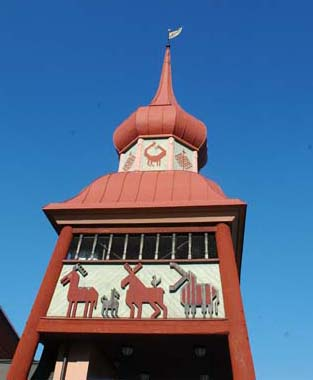
Jamtli was a result of the native district movement.

Östersund was a city in symbiosis with the countryside surrounding it; both economically and culturally and the extremely unusual "native district movement" broke ground in the beginning of the 20th century. In 1908 the organization Jämtslöjd was founded, joining the ancient monument association. Together they started planning an open-air museum – Jamtli. The museum was later followed by a county museum and the Regional Archives in Östersund. An important element in the culture was Jämtland's library, which was moved from Frösön to Östersund in 1912. Östersund thus came to possess one of the most valuable libraries in northern Scandinavia.

The time preceding World War I was a very important time for Östersund due to the fact that most of what characterized Östersund as a city was established then. The idealistic views among the population had expressed itself through popular movements, and continued to do so. "If it had come to moving Åreskutan rock by rock we'd have deemed it possible," an older Good Templar later said. When the population constantly grew, new constructions were built. It was at this time that the great city hall was built in 1912 according to the drawings of Frans Bertil Wallberg.

Among the Good Templars, local history become extremely popular and the temperance movement became intertwined with the native district movement. The Good Templars saw industrialization as a significant threat to the native districts and the old village and farming community. Due to most of Östersund's population having their roots in the Jamtish countryside the city was spared from city-village tensions. The joint work of the movements made the city and its centre-right (Swedish: borgerlig, see burgh and bourgeoisie) governance extremely hostile to industry. Instead they wanted to portray Östersund as a centre of outdoor activities, culture, education and tourism. Industry was not allowed to threaten the good environment, fresh air, nature and cultural history traditions.

== War and crisis ==
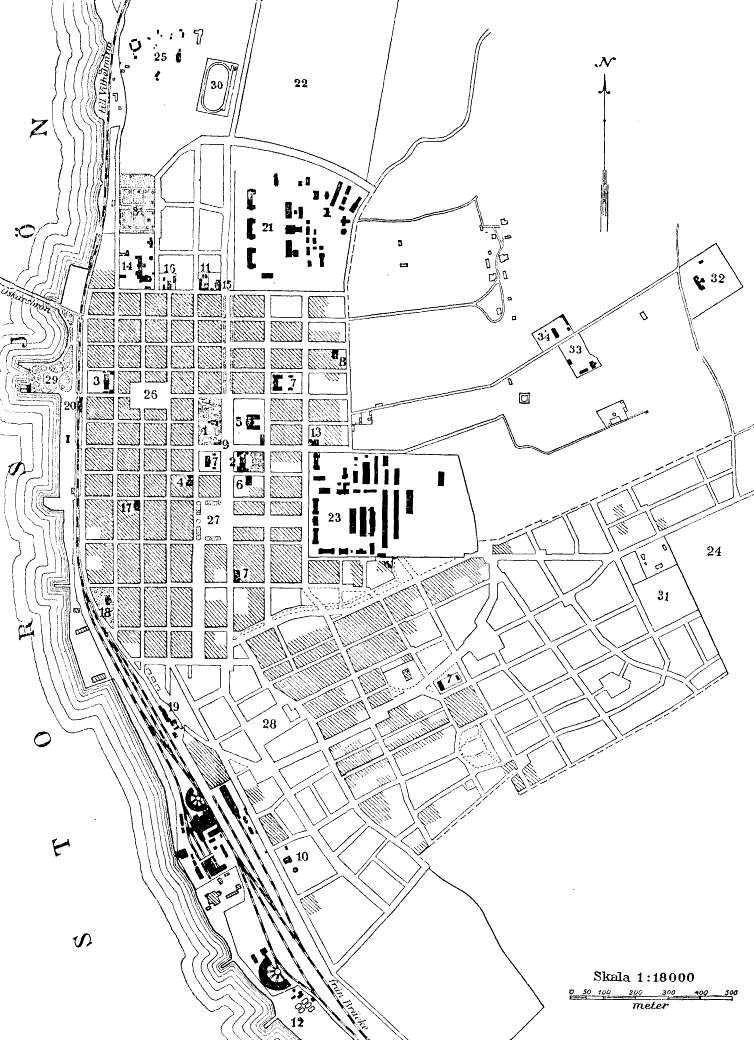
Östersund's city map of 1922

However, everything was not positive in the city. Signs of harsher times were evident. The labour market conflict of 1909 (the Swedish General Strike) was the culmination of growing tension between workers and employers. No larger encounters occurred though the strike was a huge setback for the labour movement in Sweden and even more so in Östersund.

In 1917, the First World War was raging on the continent, and the February Revolution of 1917, which ushered in the Russian Revolution, also affected Östersund. Rationing led to shortages of food and supplies and a revolution was feared. Some of the citizens, primarily soldiers, went on hunger strikes and on the first of May that year 4,000 demonstrators gathered in front of the city hall demanding lower prices on milk and wood.

The year after, the Spanish flu spread across the world. The city doctor in Östersund noted that "Östersund ought without objection to have been more haunted by the flu than any other Swedish city", which is why Östersund was referred to by locals as spanska sjukans huvudstad, 'capital of the Spanish flu'. The old school (today the tourist agency) became a temporary hospital and since no crisis centre existed several organizations stepped in to help the population. The authorities also did what they could by banning public gatherings, in addition to closing theaters and cinemas.

== Interwar period ==
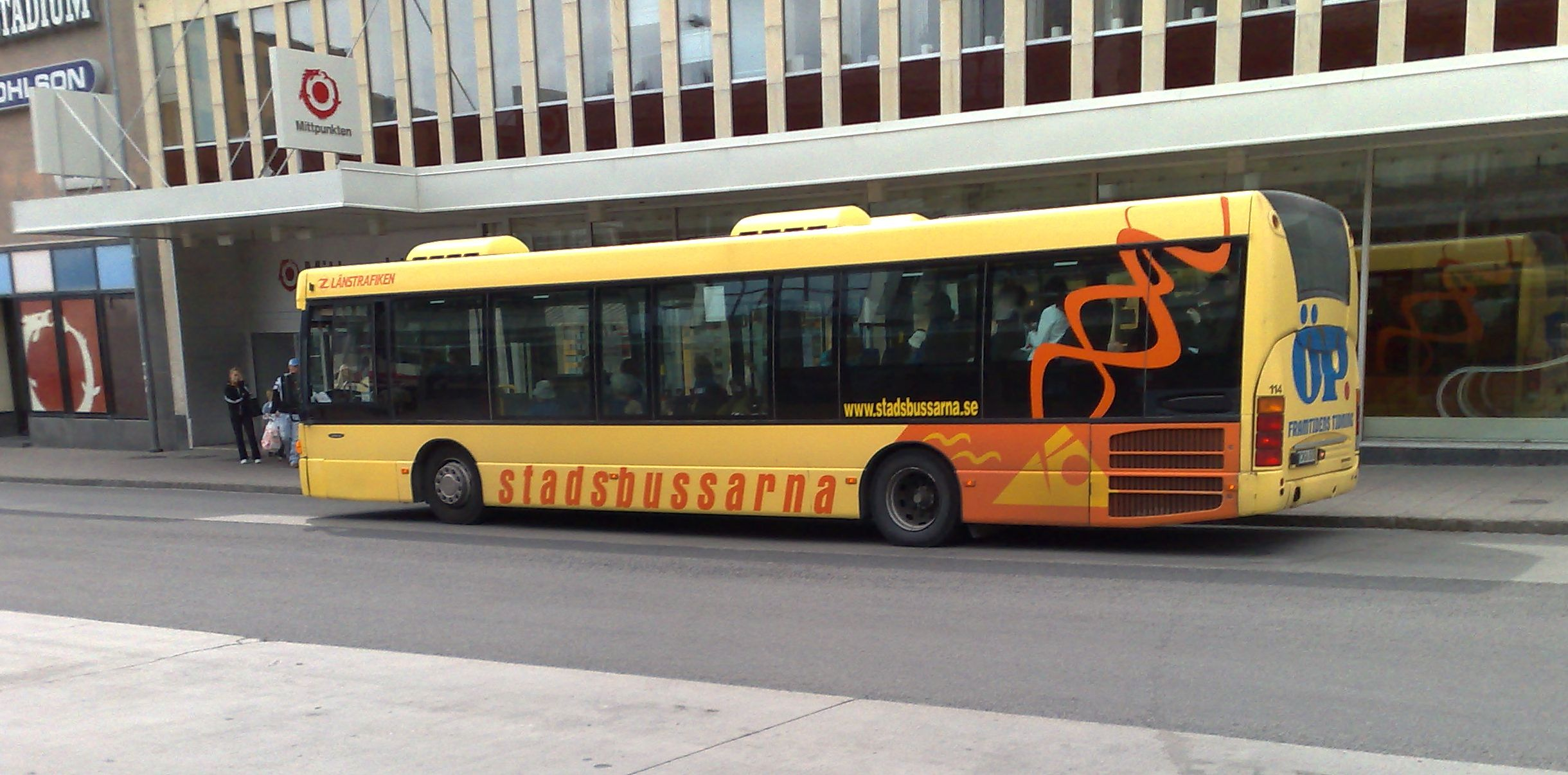
One of Östersund's city buses outside of the shopping mall Mittpunkten.

Despite the Great Depression and several crises resulting in a very high unemployment rate, Östersund continued to grow in the interwar period. In 1918 the Odenslund area was incorporated. The business sector remained largely unaffected and Östersund continued to be one of the least industrialized cities in Sweden. Instead Östersund continued to focus on wholesale trade and became a centre for it in northern and north-central Sweden. The city's central position was strengthened when the Inlandsbanan railway was constructed through Jämtland from the north to the south.

During the interwar period the car and the bus became common. The first scheduled bus route was created in the 1920s between Östersund and the nearby town of Brunflo. In the next decade well over 40 bus routes were functioning in Östersund. The buses were of the skvader type, a cross between a bus and a truck carrying both people and milk bottles. The dairy was located west of the bus square, Gustav III:s torg, at the current location of the shopping mall Kärnan. This square naturally become a central part of the city.

Social life changed. Östersunds rundradiostation started its radio broadcasts in 1927 and the cinemas became a natural form of entertainment for many. The first large facilities for sport began to be built. In 1917 Hofvallen was opened and in the 1930s a bath house, a harness racing course and the tennis hall were built.

The Good Templar movement won the Swedish prohibition referendum of 1922 by a landslide in Jämtland County, 72.2 per cent of the population supported prohibition (63.5 per cent of the males and 83.2 per cent of the females). No prohibition was introduced though when Sweden as a whole voted against it. Despite the massive amount of support regionally, the movement began declining. The movement did, however, make its mark on the city. When the Good Templar house's sign was changed in 1947 to teater ('theater') on what is now Gamla Teatern, 'the old theater', it marked the beginning of a new era.

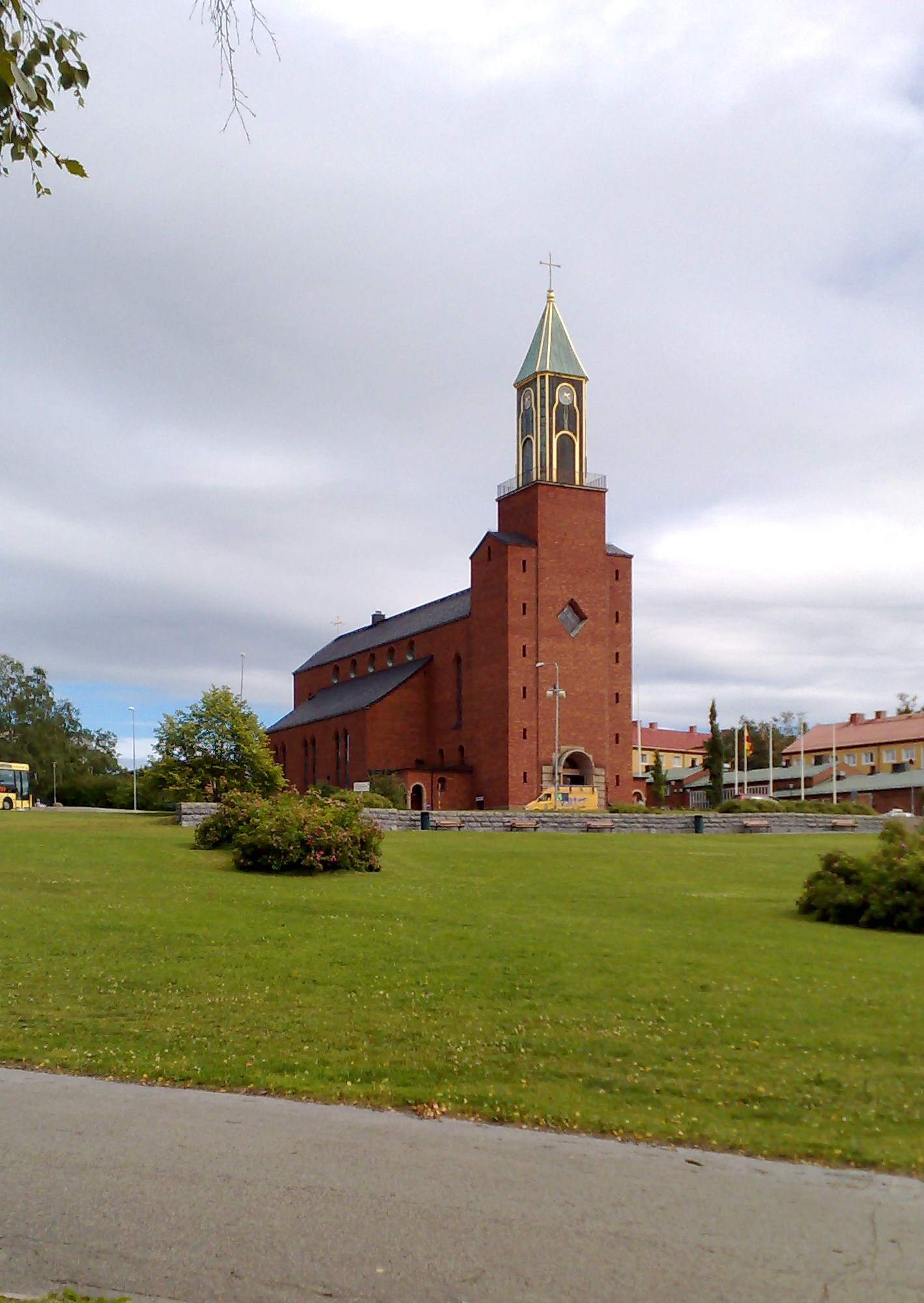
The large brick church was built in front of Österängsparken 1940, during World War II.

== Post-war period ==
Östersund continued to grow after World War II. Lugnvik was incorporated into the city in 1954 and Östersund was, like the rest of Jämtland, affected by the Rehn-Meidner-model, though not in the same way. The Swedish Keynesian policy was launched in order to improve the mobility of the labour force. Jämtland was struck hard by this when the people moved from the countryside to cities, from inland to coast and from the north to the south. As an urban area Östersund was affected by the Million Programme and urban districts like Körfältet were created.

The negative view towards industry changed when the Social Democrats came to power for the first time in the city's history in 1952. Industries were enticed to Östersund through the national localization policy and industrial areas were created in Odenskog and Lugnvik.

Development was not, as already mentioned, as good in the rest of Jämtland as it was in Östersund and as a counter to the governmental policy, the Republic of Jamtland was established in 1963. Östersund became the capital of the tongue-in-cheek republic and the home of the freedom festival Storsjöyran.

Östersund became the capital of the Republic of Jamtland. Its flag can be seen throughout the year at the main town square.

Östersund continued to grow and in 1970 Frösö köping was made part of Östersund. In 1971 a major reform occurred in Sweden creating large municipalities replacing all the older institutions; the new large municipality was named after the city. As in the rest of Sweden, the public sector greatly expanded at this time. In 1960 the public sector of Sweden constituted about 30 per cent of Sweden's total gross domestic product; by the mid-1980s the number had grown to 65 per cent. At the time jobs were growing in the county council, the government and in the new municipality. The main reasons for the large expansion were the expanded transfer payment to the households that occurred along with growing interest and public consumption. Everything was financed by heavy tax increases. The entirety of the 1970s was a period of expansion. Besides the new industrial complex the Frösö bridge was constructed, a new police station, Z-kupolen (burned to the ground in 1989), Storsjöteatern, Folkets hus, neighborhood churches, malls, etc. The county administrative office and the hospital were expanded and large residential areas grew up in the aforementioned Körfältet and Lugnvik areas, as well as in Odensala.

As early as the 1940s, the city tried to have a humanities university college located on Frösön. Opposition between cities in Norrland was great and it was Umeå that finally emerged victorious in 1962. Östersund did, however, get a university college for social workers (socialhögskola) in 1971.

== 21st century ==
Since 2005 Östersund has been one of the main campus sites of the Mid Sweden University (Mittuniversitetet). A number of governmental offices have also been built in the city in recent years.

An asylum centre has now opened near Östersund.
