= To Kill a Child =

To Kill a Child may refer to:

- "To Kill a Child" (short story), 1948 short story by Stig Dagerman
  - To Kill a Child (1953 film), Swedish short film based on the short story
  - To Kill a Child (2003 film), Swedish-Finnish short film based on the short story
