= Cecilia von der Esch =

Swedish actress and comedian

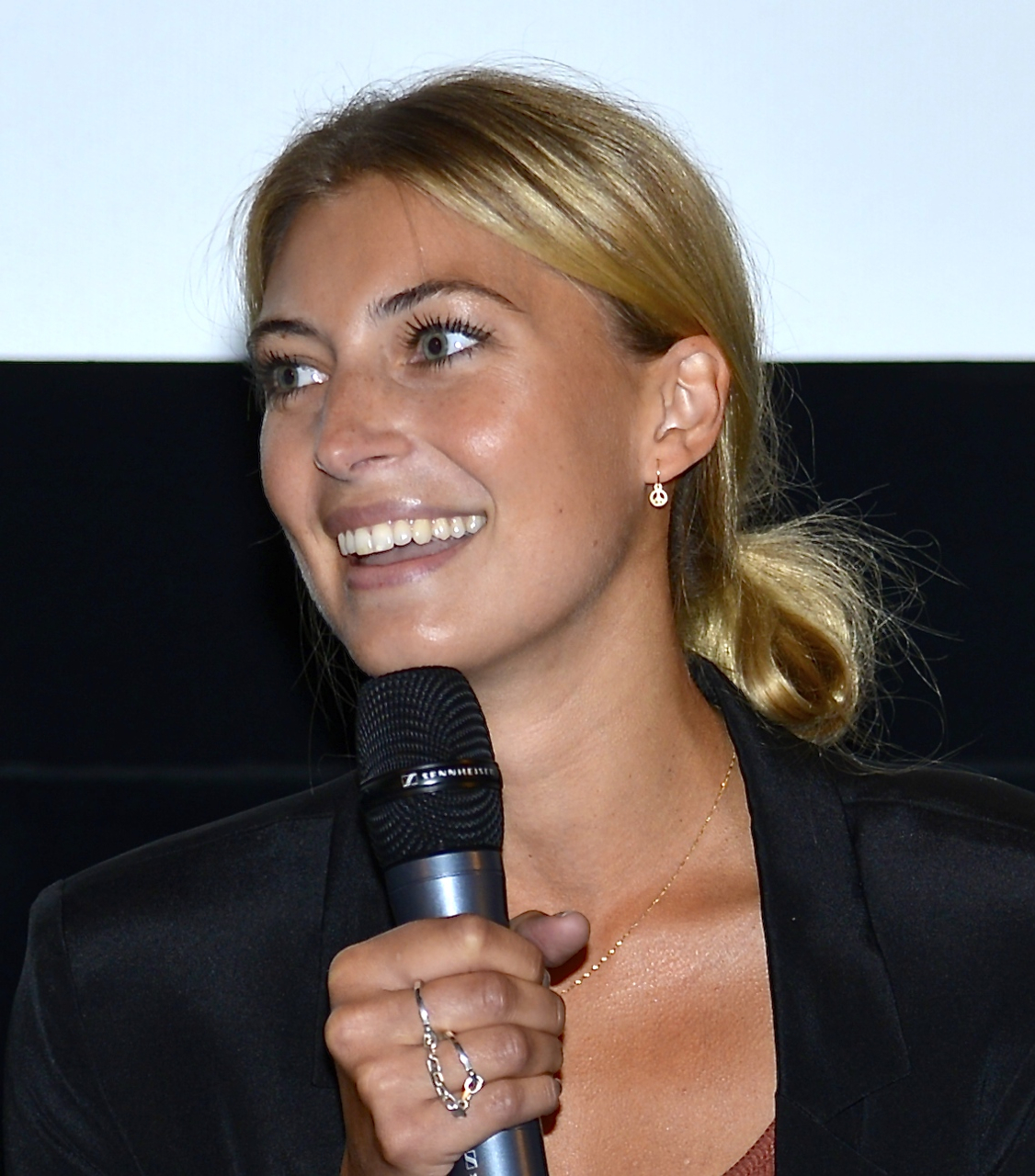
- Cecilia von der Esch in 2020
- Born: Helga Cecilia Forss; 12 June 1985 (age 40); Falun, Dalarna, Sweden
- Occupations: Actress and comedian
- Years active: 2004–present
- Spouse: Fredrik von der Esch (2020–present)
- Children: 2

Helga Cecilia von der Esch (née Forss; born 12 June 1985) is a Swedish actress and comedian. Her breakthrough role was the role of Jennifer in the 2010 film Simple Simon and Cindy in the ICA commercials.

== Biography ==
Helga Cecilia Forss was born 12 June 1985 in Falun, Sweden. When she was seven, she participated in a segment of Trafikmagasinet on SVT. Her film debut was in Maria Blom's 2004 film Dalecarlians. She joined Nour El-Refai in the hidden camera show Raj Raj broadcast on TV400. She also worked with El-Refai, Johan Matton, Björn Gustafsson, and Peter Settman in the TV3 comedy show Hus i helvete. With El-Refai and Maud Lindström, she has written and performed the act Almost Like Boys at the National Swedish Touring Theatre in 2008, a comedy act about gender. She has also appeared in Henrik Schyffert's comedy series Sverige pussas och kramas on Kanal 5. In summer 2009, she also participated in Kanal 5 series Ballar of stål.

In 2008, she participated in the TV game show Brain Wall, teaming up with El-Refai and Grete Havnesköld. In 2009 Forss participated in the Sveriges Radio comedy show Kungen kommer till Rissne. With Martin Soneby, she presented the show Silent Library on Kanal 5. In 2008 she became known for her role as Cindy in the ICA commercials. In 2010 she starred as Jennifer in the film Simple Simon with Bill Skarsgård, earning her a Guldbagge nomination for supporting actress in a feature film. In August 2011 she was the host of an episode of Sommar i P1 on Sveriges Radio.

She was a sidekick to Pär Lernström in Idol 2011 on TV4. Since 2012 she has been a goodwill ambassador for the Child Cancer Foundation.

In 2013, she participated in the play De 39 stegen at Intiman in Stockholm.

She competed as a celebrity dancer in Let's Dance 2022, which was broadcast by TV4.

In 2025, she played the role of Sophie von Kronenberg in The Ugly Stepsister.
