= Don't Click =

Don't Click may refer to:

- Don't Click (2012 film), a South Korean horror film
- Don't Click (2020 film), a Canadian horror film
