= Götene Municipality =

Götene Municipality Götene kommun
- Municipality
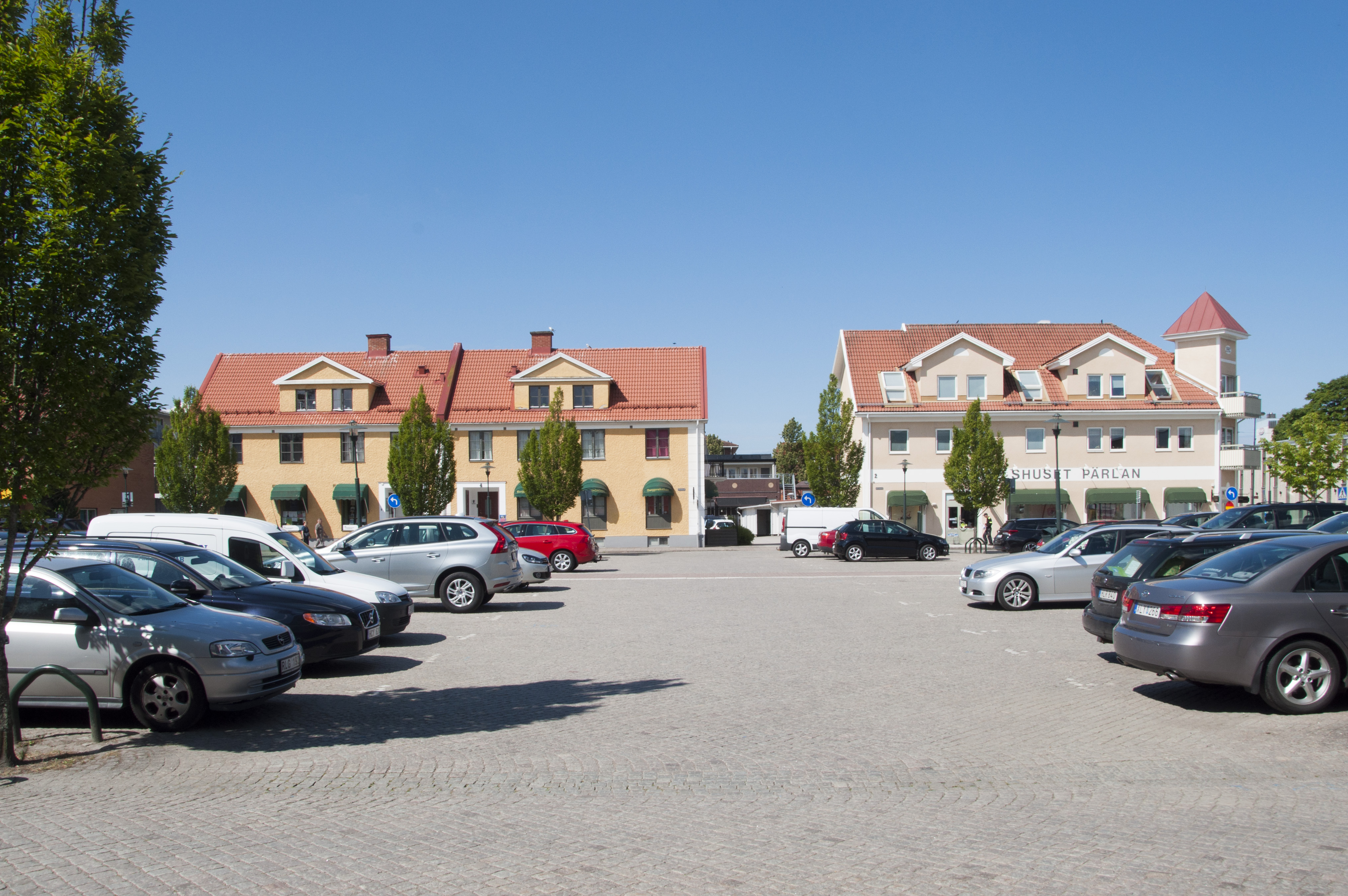

- Coat of arms

- Coordinates: 58°32′N 13°29′E
- Country: Sweden
- County: Västra Götaland County
- Seat: Götene

Area
  - Total: 620.7686 km^{2} (239.6801 sq mi)
  - Land: 404.5686 km^{2} (156.2048 sq mi)
  - Water: 216.2 km^{2} (83.5 sq mi)
- Area as of 1 January 2014.

Population (30 June 2025)
  - Total: 13,274
  - Density: 32.810/km^{2} (84.978/sq mi)
- Time zone: UTC+1 (CET)
  - Summer (DST): UTC+2 (CEST)
- ISO 3166 code: SE
- Province: Västergötland
- Municipal code: 1471
- Website: www.gotene.se

Götene Municipality (Swedish: Götene kommun) is a municipality in Västra Götaland County in western Sweden. Its seat is located in the town of Götene.

When the first Swedish local government acts went into force in 1863, 20 rural municipal entities (each corresponding to a parish of the Church of Sweden) were created in the area. The municipal reform of 1952 grouped them into three, new, larger units. These were amalgamated in 1967 to form the present municipality.

The two most notable sights in the municipality are the mountain/ridge Kinnekulle (with 306 meters the highest point in the county) and the village Husaby, with an old church and church well, where the first Christian king of Sweden, Olof Skötkonung, is believed to have been baptized.

== Localities ==
Population figures from Statistics Sweden.

- Götene (seat), 4,600
- Källby, 1,500
- Lundsbrunn, 900
- Hällekis, 700

== Demographics ==
This is a demographic table based on Götene Municipality's electoral districts in the 2022 Swedish general election sourced from SVT's election platform, in turn taken from SCB official statistics.

In total there were 13,244 residents, including 10,275 Swedish citizens of voting age. 48.0% voted for the left coalition and 50.8% for the right coalition. Indicators are in percentage points except population totals and income.

Location	Residents	Citizen adults	Left vote	Right vote	Employed	Swedish parents	Foreign heritage	Income SEK	Degree
Location			%	%					
Götene 1	1,164	889	50.6	47.6	82	80	20	24,849	27
Götene 2	1,775	1,386	48.5	49.6	76	79	21	21,884	26
Götene-Holmestad	2,078	1,511	45.7	53.7	78	74	26	23,153	22
Hällekis-Forshem	2,044	1,702	54.3	44.4	82	92	8	24,782	37
Källbyorten	2,437	1,890	48.4	50.5	89	92	8	28,126	41
Lundsbrunnsorten	1,751	1,358	41.9	57.3	87	91	9	27,246	30
Sil-Husaby	1,995	1,539	47.9	51.4	87	89	11	27,647	33
Source: SVT

== Sister cities ==
Götene has a sister city in Lithuania called Pasvalys which has about 7,500 inhabitants.

== Tourism ==
Götene is part of the Läckö-Kinnekulle tourism area. To boast its geographical uniqueness, it uses a symbol of the Kinnekulle mountain mirroring in Lake Vänern.
