= Sthlm (TV series) =

2008 Swedish TV series

- Created by: Håkan Lindhé
- Written by: Håkan Lindhé
- Directed by: Håkan Lindhé
- Original language: Swedish
- No. of episodes: 6

Original release
- Network: SVT
- Release: April 28 – June 2, 2008

Sthlm ("Stockholm") is a Swedish six-part TV series from 2008, written and directed by Håkan Lindhé. It follows a day in the life of six ordinary, somewhat lonely people.

Shooting began in September 2006.

== Part 1 (Johan) ==
Plot: Johan has trouble with his mentally ill mother who thinks she is a member of the royalty. He tries to get free from her, which turns out not to be easy.

- Erik Johansson – Johan
- Eva Fritjofsson – Mother Louise
- Eva Röse – Elin
- Andreas Nilsson – P-G, human resources director at Elgiganten
- Svetlana Rodina-Ljungkvist – Dr. Bogren
- Jens Hultén – Nurse
- Nicklas Gustavsson – Security guard
- Christian Wennberg – Customer at Elgiganten

== Part 2 (Farouk) ==
Plot: Farouk is a bored taxi driver, but when a pregnant woman has to be taken to a hospital, he has greater responsibility than a taxi driver normally should, as the woman is mentally ill and wants to get rid of her new-born baby.

- Michalis Koutsogiannakis – Farouk
- Johanna Wilson – Johanna, the pregnant woman
- Björn Bengtsson – Claes
- Susan Taslimi – Farouk's wife
- Sannamari Patjas – Midwife

== Part 3 (Adam) ==
Plot: Adam is a nine-year-old lonely child with rather irresponsible parents. When his father fetches him from school on a Friday afternoon he has alternative plans for the weekend: to travel on a luxury boat with his friend and party, and Adam is coming with him.

- Kristoffer Stålfors – Adam
- Peter Engman – Micke, Adam's father
- Mattias Silvell – Kricke
- Helena af Sandeberg – Isabel
- Linda Santiago – Adam's mother
- Claudia Galli – Adam's teacher
