= IRL (2013 film) =

2013 Swedish drama film

- Theatrical release poster
- Directed by: Erik Leijonborg
- Written by: Alex Haridi
- Produced by: Eyeworks Film & TV Drama
- Starring: Valter Skarsgård; Happy Jankell; Alba August; Magnus Krepper
- Distributed by: SF Film
- Release date: 25 October 2013
- Running time: 80 minutes
- Country: Sweden
- Language: Swedish

IRL (In Real Life) is a Swedish 2013 drama film, directed by Erik Leijonborg.

The picture is a remake of the Belgian film Ben X (2007) by Nic Balthazar, although unlike in Ben X, the main character is not autistic.

It stars Valter Skarsgård as a teenager who finds solace in the MMORPG The Secret World as a result of severe bullying.

== Plot ==
Elias is a high school junior struggling with constant bullying and torment from his fellow students, especially his neighbour, Agnes. Increasingly distant from his divorced father, Stefan, his younger brother, Jonas, and his best friend, Adam, he finds solace in the online game The Secret World, where he befriends the avatar Sc4rlet.

After he is stripped down and videotaped, and ridiculously edited footage uploaded to YouTube, Elias becomes increasingly angry and depressed, contemplating suicide. Later that night, Sc4rlet sends him her photo and an invitation to meet at the central station of their hometown, Stockholm, but after his phone is stolen by Agnes and destroyed, their meeting is ruined as Elias cannot find her. Spotting her on the train home, he is afraid of talking to her and steps off the train to jump onto the tracks. He is narrowly saved by Sc4rlet, who suspected the boy of being him, and they soon become friends.

As things progress, Sc4rlet begins pressuring Elias to stand up for himself, helping him plan his revenge on his tormentors. They decide to go after Agnes, the leader of the gang, hoping that it will cause the others to stop. They soon make a plan to strip her naked and post photos of her on the internet, mirroring what she did to Elias earlier, and later steal drugs from the local hospital for him to use. The following day, Elias attacks her during an outdoor gymnastics class, but she manages to fight him off, and he's left alone in the forest after she injects him with the drugs intended for her. Hallucinating from the injection, Elias begins seeing Sc4rlet, who leads him to the roof of the building next door to his apartment, where she tells him that they will "die together, like he wants to". Meanwhile, Elias' father, Stefan, finds the stolen drugs in his son's bedroom, alongside an unedited video of the earlier incident at school, given to him by Adam. Stefan then spots Elias alone on the next door roof and comes to his rescue just in time.

Elias wakes up in the hospital, where Stefan angrily berates him for not telling him about the bullying and the drugs. Stefan asks Elias what he can do to help, and Elias asks him that there's only one thing he wants to do. After being discharged from the hospital, Elias records a suicide letter on video and says goodbye to his friends and family. That night, Sc4rlet appears in his room, and we realize that she never stepped off the train in the beginning, and that Elias has been envisioning her to help him. She spends the night, comforting him. The next day, he boards the ferry to Åland, where Sc4rlet appears once again, asking if he is sure about what he is doing. He sets up his camera to record and jumps off the ferry in the middle of the sea.

Three days later, Stefan is watching a news report about his son's disappearance and suspected suicide. The next day a memorial is held at his school, where the students mourn Elias. As the principal takes the stage to give a speech, Adam cuts into the projector feed, playing Elias' suicide note to the entire school, who watch in shock as he exposes Agnes and her friends, before cutting to the unedited video of the incident, revealing Agnes and her friends as they truly are. As the students struggle to come to grips with what they have seen, Elias appears on the gallery behind them, alive and well. A quick flashback reveals that Elias had jumped to a deck below, where his father caught him. They then faked the disappearance and suicide, with the faked suicide video as "evidence", in order to bring attention to the bullying.

Some time later, Stefan, Elias, and Jonas, a family once again, are watching an interview with Stefan on television, where he is questioned about the ethics of Elias faking his death like he did. Stefan then responds that bullying is never taken seriously, "not until someone dies. We needed someone to die, so that the world could see the truth." A vision of Sc4rlet appears once again, smiling at Elias, who, for the first time, can smile again. He decides to find her and, using the number she texted him from earlier in the film, tracks her down, learning that her real name is Scarlet Friedmann. Elias finally meets Scarlet, who recognizes him from the train and tells him that she waited for him at the station and was sad when he never showed up, but is glad that he finally dared to meet her.

== Cast ==
- Valter Skarsgård as Elias, a troubled high school junior.
- Happy Jankell as Scarlet, Elias' online and later real life friend.
- Alba August as Agnes, Elias' neighbour and long-time tormentor
- Magnus Krepper as Stefan, Elias' divorced father.
- Ola Andreasson as Adam, Elias' best friend.

== Production ==
The film was shot on location at multiple sites in Stockholm, including Stockholm södra underground train station, during spring and summer 2013. It was released in Sweden on October 25, 2013.
