= Kolbjörn Skarsgård =

Swedish actor (born 2012)

- Born: August 2012 (age 14); Stockholm, Sweden
- Occupation: Actor
- Years active: 2022–present
- Father: Stellan Skarsgård
- Relatives: Alexander Skarsgård (half-brother); Gustaf Skarsgård (half-brother); Bill Skarsgård (half-brother); Valter Skarsgård (half-brother)

Kolbjörn Skarsgård (Swedish: [ˈkɔlbjœːɳ ˈskɑ̌ːʂɡoːɖ]; born August 2012) is a Swedish child actor. He is a member of the Skarsgård acting family.

== Early life ==
Skarsgård was born in Stockholm in August 2012, the son of actor Stellan Skarsgård and film producer and screenwriter Megan Everett. He is the younger paternal half-brother of Alexander Skarsgård, Gustaf Skarsgård, Bill Skarsgård, and Valter Skarsgård, who are all also actors.

== Career ==
He made his screen debut in 2022 as the nine-year-old Clark Olofsson, in Netflix series Clark, in which his half-brother Bill Skarsgård also appeared as an older version of the same character. That same year, he appeared as Milo in the rebooted Swedish television series Kenny Starfighter.

Skarsgård has a role in the 2025 Swedish horror television series Blood Cruise, in a cast which includes Björn Bengtsson, Jessica Grabowsky, Tuppence Middleton and Marika Lagercrantz.

== Filmography ==
Year	Title	Role	Notes
2022	Clark	Young Clark Olofsson	5 episodes
2022	Kenny Starfighter	Milo	8 episodes
2024	Neon	Neon	Short film
2025	Blood Cruise	Walter	6 episodes
