= Blood Cruise =

Swedish horror television series

- Genre: Horror
- Created by: Chris Andrews; Mats Strandberg
- Based on: Färjan by Mats Strandberg
- Written by: Mats Strandberg; Malin Lagerlöf; Chris Andrews
- Directed by: Jonas Alexander Arnby
- Starring: Tuppence Middleton; Kolbjörn Skarsgård; Björn Bengtsson; Jessica Grabowsky
- Composer: Mikkel Hess
- Country of origin: Sweden
- Original languages: Swedish; English
- No. of series: 1
- No. of episodes: 6

Production
- Executive producers: Andy Serkis; Sonja Nilsson Hermele; Johanna Gårdare; Lindsey Martin; Dave Clarke; Phil Robertson; Jonathan Cavendish; Mats Strandberg; Jonas Alexander Arnby
- Producers: Alexander Rönnberg; Will Tennant
- Cinematography: Josua Enblom
- Editors: Linda Jildmalm; Robert Krantz
- Running time: 43–44 minutes
- Production companies: Northern Fable; Imaginarium Productions; CBS Studios

Original release
- Network: SVT
- Release: 26 September – 24 October 2025

Blood Cruise (Swedish: Färjan, lit. 'the Ferry') is a Swedish horror television series adapted from Mats Strandberg's 2015 novel Färjan, and starring Björn Bengtsson, Tuppence Middleton, Kolbjörn Skarsgård and Jessica Grabowsky.

== Cast ==
- Tuppence Middleton as Edith
- Björn Bengtsson as Dan
- Kolbjörn Skarsgård as Walter
- Marika Lagercrantz as Marianne
- Orlando Wahlsteen as Albin
- Lissa Edil as Lo
- Jessica Grabowsky as Pia
- Arvin Kananian as Calle
- Sabina Khamoshi as Vida
- Thomas Hanzon as Göran
- Scott Arthur as Vincent
- Christopher Wagelin as Mårten

== Production ==
The six-part series is produced for SVT, and is adapted from the 2015 Mats Strandberg novel Färjan, which was nominated for book of the year by the European Science Fiction Society. It comes from Northern Fable and Imaginarium Productions. Strandberg and Malin LagerLöf are the scriptwriters, with Jonas Alexander Arnby as director. Northern Fable’s Alexander Rönnberg and Imaginarium’s Will Tennant are producers, with Jonathan Cavendish and Phil Robertson executive producers for Imaginarium, Sonja Hermele and Johanna Gårdare for SVT, and Lindsey Martin and Dave Clarke for CBS Studios.

The cast includes Björn Bengtsson, Jessica Grabowsky, Tuppence Middleton and Kolbjörn Skarsgård, as well as Thomas Hanzon, Marika Lagercrantz, Orlando Wahlsteen, Lissa Edil and Sabina Khamoshi.

First-look images from filming were released to the media in March 2025.

== Broadcast ==
The series was released in 2025.
