= Eva Röse =

Swedish actress

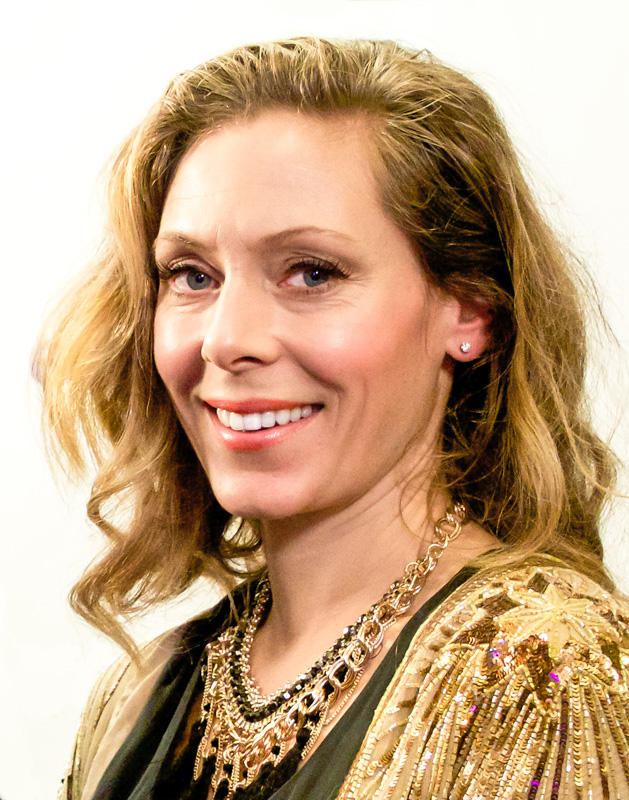
- Eva Röse (2013)

President of the Republic of Jamtland
- Incumbent
- Assumed office 23 May 2022
- Preceded by: Ewert Ljusberg

Personal details
- Born: Eva Charlotta Röse; 16 October 1973 (age 52) Stockholm, Sweden
- Spouse: Jacob Felländer (m. 2014)
- Children: 4
- Occupation: Actress

Eva Röse (born 16 October 1973) is a Swedish actress and television host. She is best known internationally for her role as the sinister android Niska in Season 1 of the Swedish science fiction TV series Real Humans. Since 2022, she is the President of the Republic of Jamtland.

== Biography ==
Röse was born in Skärholmen, Stockholm, and began acting as a child at Vår teater, a children's theater in Stockholm.

Röse started, together with Alice Bah Kuhnke and Johan Petersson, as a presenter for Sveriges Television's Disneyklubben and then studied at the Swedish National Academy of Mime and Acting. She graduated in 1998 and has had roles in films as well as at the Royal Dramatic Theatre and Stockholm City Theatre. She was appointed UNICEF Goodwill Ambassador in 2007.

Röse has also been an emcee and awards presenter at a number of cultural events, including the August Prize ceremony and the Stockholm International Film Festival. In 2016, she was the main character in one of the episodes of Sveriges Television's version of Who Do You Think You Are?. Among other things, it was revealed that she is related to actress Bibi Andersson and that her grandfather made his living whaling in Antarctica.

In 2018, she was awarded the Carl Åkermark Prize.

In 2022, Röse was elected President of the Republic of Jamtland, a semi-fictitious micronation within the Kingdom of Sweden.

Röse is married and has four children with photographer and musician Jacob Felländer.

== Filmography ==
- Adam & Eva (1997), One of Tove's girl friends
- Längtans blåa blomma (1998), Beata 'Betty' Tollman
- Magnetisörens femte vinter (1999), Sofie
- Blå Måndag (2001), Eva Lindgren
- Me and Morrison (2001), Sophie
- Kopps (2003), Jessica
- Villmark (2003), Elin
- Storm (2006), Lova
- Att göra en pudel (2006), Rita
- Göta Kanal 2 (2006), Petra Andersson
- Mirakel (2006), Victoria Eek
- Rallybrudar (2008), Ulla
- Sthlm (2008)
- Maria Wern (TV series) (2008–2023)
- Göta kanal 3 (2009), Petra
- Submission (2010), Herself – documentary by Stefan Jarl
- Real Humans (TV-series, 2012)
- The Paradise Suite (2015)
- The Postcard Killings (2020), DS Agneta Hoglund
- Heder
