= To Kill a Child (short story) =

1948 short story by Stig Dagerman

- Author: Stig Dagerman
- Original title: Att döda ett barn
- Language: Swedish
- Genre: Short story
- Set in: Sweden
- Published: 1948
- Publisher: National Society for Road Safety
- Text: To Kill a Child at Wikisource

To Kill a Child (Swedish: Att döda ett barn) is a short story by Stig Dagerman. It was published in 1948 and was likely the most famous of Stig Dagerman's texts. The short story can be found in the Swedish posthumous collections Vårt behov av tröst (1955) and Dikter, noveller, prosafragment (1981).

== Background ==
The short story was written in 1948 for the National Society for Road Safety in an attempt to slow down the traffic and decrease the number of traffic accidents.

== Plot ==
In a scaled and clear prose, but with a fateful feel, the everyday life of the involved characters is depicted before one of them unintentionally hits a small child with a car. The readers know what will happen from the very start and the author works with a narration technique called planting. The story gives few details about the people involved, which means that anyone can imagine themselves as the characters and relate to them. There are multiple plot lines as two courses of events happen simultaneously.

== Adaptations ==
Two films have been made based on the short story, To Kill a Child (1953) and To Kill a Child (2003). The latter was directed by Alexander Skarsgård.
