= Alida Morberg =

Swedish actress (born 1985)

- Born: 30 January 1985 (age 41); Lilla Edet, Sweden
- Occupation: Actress
- Partner: Bill Skarsgård
- Children: 2
- Father: Per Morberg

Alida Indra Jasmin Morberg (born 30 January 1985) is a Swedish actress.

== Personal life ==
Alida Morberg is the daughter of actor Per Morberg and she grew up in Lilla Edet. She is in a relationship with actor Bill Skarsgård, with whom she has two children.

== Filmography ==
- Gangster (2007)
- Insane (2010)
- Maria Wern – Stum sitter guden (2010)
- Medan du blundar (2011)
- Elsas värld (2011), Marilyn
- Rosor, kyssar och döden (2013)
- Stockholm Stories (2014)
- Beck – Rum 302 (2015)
- Black Lake (2018) – TV series
- Clark (2022) – TV series
