= Republic of Jamtland =

Humorous micronation in Jämtland

United Republics of Jamtland, Herjeådalen and Ravund De förenade republikerna Jamtland, Herjeådalen och Ravund (Swedish)
- Micronation (unrecognized entity)

The United Republics of Jamtland, Herjeådalen and Ravund (often shortened to the Republic of Jamtland) is a humorous culture and marketing project or micronation, with regionalist and historical elements based in the Swedish County of Jämtland, located in the middle of Scandinavia. From the 10th to 12th century Jamtland was self-governing and was independent of any crown, hence the name "Republic of Jamtland". It was annexed in 1178 to the crown of Norway. It still exercised significant self-rule, and its primary connection to the Norwegian king was through paying royal taxes. The Orkney Islands were the only other area that enjoyed similar self-rule.

== History ==
The concept of the Republic of Jamtland was founded in 1964 (recalling the former 10th-century republic) in reaction to emigration from the county. The event that triggered its foundation was the centralist plan of Swedish officials to merge Jämtland County with Västernorrland County. The founders organized an association, The Liberation Movement, and mobilized the people through the "freedom festival" Storsjöyran. TV entertainer Yngve Gamlin was "elected" president, and Jamtland was proclaimed a republic in its own right, within the Kingdom of Sweden.

The second president, the comedian Moltas Erikson, described the Liberation Movement as "51% in jest and 49% in earnest". It is largely seen as a humorous hoax, and actual support for an independent state among the local population is low. The movement's main focus is to preserve and promote the Jamtlandic culture, language and way of life, but not independence for the three "constituent republics".

The third president was Ewert Ljusberg, a man again from show business. Once a year he made a popular speech at the city festival Storsjöyran in Östersund where he agitated against and mocked the "Big-Swedes", the Swedish government and the European Union, in a simultaneously serious and joking manner.

Actress and television host Eva Röse was elected the Republic's fourth president in 2022.

== National symbols ==
Flag of the Republic of Jamtland

The flag of the Republic of Jamtland is a blue-white-green tricolor containing a seal granted to Jamtland by the King of Norway in the 13th century, notably containing the Norwegian Lion in its centre. Despite having no official legal status, the flag is popular in Jamtland and the Jamtland diaspora. The republic also has its own national anthem, entitled "Jämtlandssången". Versions of the song exist in both Swedish and Jamtlandic, the official language of the republic.

== Presidents of the Republic of Jamtland ==
- 1963–1983: Yngve Gamlin (1926–1995)
- 1983–1988: Moltas Erikson (1932–1988)
- 1988–2021: Ewert Ljusberg (1945–2021)
- 2022–present: Eva Röse (born 1973)
