= Funhouse (2019 film) =

2019 Swedish-Canadian horror film

- Directed by: Jason William Lee
- Written by: Jason William Lee
- Starring: Valter Skarsgård
- Cinematography: Shawn Seifert
- Edited by: Jason William Lee
- Music by: Blake Matthew
- Production companies: Ti Bonny Productions; Sandcastle Pictures; Invention Films
- Distributed by: Magnet Releasing
- Release date: October 25, 2019
- Running time: 106 minutes
- Countries: Sweden; Canada
- Language: English

Funhouse is a 2019 horror film directed and written by Jason William Lee. The film stars Valter Skarsgård as Kaspar, a washed up reality TV star who is duped into taking part in a reality show where the losers are killed in brutal ways.

== Plot ==
Eight people, reality star Kasper, bride-to-be Lonni, chess master, actress and martial artist Cat Zim, Instagram personality Ula, YouTuber Nevin, singer Dex, boxer Headstone, and blogger Ximena, are invited to join a new reality show hosted by a CGI panda named Furcas.

The premise is that contestants will be filmed 24/7, and contestants vote for who they like most. Every three days, the lowest-voted contestant must take part in a penalty game where if they lose, they are eliminated. If two contestants tie, they compete against each other. Anyone who tries to leave is penalized and removed.

Unknown to them, the show is run by Nero Alexander, a wealthy sociopath who pays people to commit murder for his entertainment. Nero directly controls the game's host and the penalty games are lethal, though the contestants initially treat the show as normal.

Some contestants refuse to play and take their own lives while one by one the rest are eliminated until only Cat remains as winner. Cat escapes, is rescued, and questioned but released. The FBI raids the house and finds only bodies.

In the final scene, Cat visits Nero, revealing she was complicit all along and implying she was meant to survive, telling him she won't let him win at chess next time.

== Cast ==
- Valter Skarsgård as Kasper Norden
- Khamisa Wilsher as Lonni Byrne
- Gigi Saul Guerrero as Ximena Torrez
- Christopher Gerard as James "Headstone" Malone
- Karolina Benefield as Ula Lamore
- Amanda Howells as Cat Zim
- Mathias Retamal as Dex
- Dayleigh Nelson as Nevin Eversmith
- Jerome Velinsky as Nero Alexander
- Kylee Bush as Darla Drake
- Debs Howard as Gilda 'The Mad' Batter

== Release ==
Funhouse first premiered in 2019. It received a VOD and limited theatrical release on May 28, 2021, through Magnet Releasing.

== Reception ==
Critical reception for Funhouse has been negative. The movie holds a rating of 0% on Rotten Tomatoes, based on 16 reviews. Common criticisms for the film centered upon the characters and the script.

Simon Abrams of RogerEbert.com gave the film a thumbs down, criticizing the characters as "meat puppet protagonists, none of whom are more sympathetic than their inhospitable circumstances", while also stating "What’s the point in watching a feel-bad movie about simulated violence when the gore and gamesmanship are as perfunctory and vapid as Nero’s lazy button-pushing speeches?". Chuck Bowen of Slant Magazine criticized Lee for not taking enough chances with the script, writing that "If Lee had the daring to consciously dehumanize his sacrificial lambs, or to allow them to more consistently dehumanize themselves for the sake of life-saving votes, Funhouse may have had enough sick punch to transcend its general obviousness. Lee broaches this idea but doesn’t commit to it."
