= Thicker Than Water (2014 TV series) =

Swedish-Finnish drama television series

- Swedish: Tjockare än vatten
- Genre: Drama
- Created by: Henrik Jansson-Schweizer
- Written by: Niklas Rockström; Morgan Jensen
- Directed by: Erik Leijonborg; Anders Engström; Erik Eger; Lisa Eriksdotter; Anette Winblad; Molly Hartleb; Johan Brisinger
- Composers: Fleshquartet; Joacim Starander
- Countries of origin: Sweden; Finland
- Original language: Swedish
- No. of seasons: 3
- No. of episodes: 27

Production
- Producer: Malte Forssell
- Running time: 44–58 minutes

Original release
- Release: 27 January 2014

Thicker Than Water (Swedish: Tjockare än vatten) is a television drama produced by Sweden's SVT in cooperation with Finland's Svenska Yle. Most of the action is set in Åland. The show's first season, consisting of ten episodes, was shown in Sweden in 2014, the second in 2016, and the third in 2020.

== Plot ==
Three siblings are reunited at their mother's guesthouse in Åland at the start of the summer. When Anna-Lisa Waldemar takes her own life, the siblings—eldest brother Lasse, a struggling Stockholm restaurateur, younger sister Jonna, an actor, and middle child Oskar, who manages the guesthouse alongside his wife Liv—discover that her will requires them to spend the season running the business before they can inherit it from her. Secrets from twenty years earlier and from more recent times are uncovered, as well as more than one body, as the siblings attempt to overcome their differences for the sake of their mother—and the money.

== Cast and characters ==
- Björn Bengtsson as Lasse Waldemar
- Joel Spira as Oskar Waldemar
- Aliette Opheim as Jonna Waldemar
- Stina Ekblad as Anna-Lisa Waldemar
- Fredrik Hammar as Mauritz Waldemar
- Jessica Grabowsky as Liv Waldemar
- Saga Sarkola as Cecilia Waldemar
- Molly Nutley as Kim Waldemar
- Donald Högberg as Konrad Waldemar
- Torkel Petersson as Manne Wahlstrom
- Johanna Ringbom as Mildred Pahkinen
- Tobias Zilliacus as Mikael Rosén
- Charlie Petersson as Vincent Högberg
- Tanja Lorentzon as Priest Petra
- Henrik Norlén as Bjarne
- Thomas Hedengran as Tommy Fasth
- Göran Forsmark as the director
- Tova Magnusson as Rachel Ohlson
- Stefan Sauk as Bear Lehman
- Alfons Röblom as Henrik Ölmqvist
- Samuli Vauramo as Wille Ek
