= Lundsbrunn =

- Location within Västra Götaland Location within Sweden
- Coordinates: 58°29′N 13°27′E
- Country: Sweden
- Province: Västergötland
- County: Västra Götaland County
- Municipality: Götene Municipality

Area
  - Total: 1.24 km^{2} (0.48 sq mi)

Population (31 December 2010)
  - Total: 887
  - Density: 717/km^{2} (1,860/sq mi)
- Time zone: UTC+1 (CET)
  - Summer (DST): UTC+2 (CEST)

Lundsbrunn is a locality situated in Götene Municipality, Västra Götaland County, Sweden. It had 887 inhabitants in 2010.
