= Björn Bengtsson =

Swedish actor (born 1972)

Björn Mikael Bengtsson
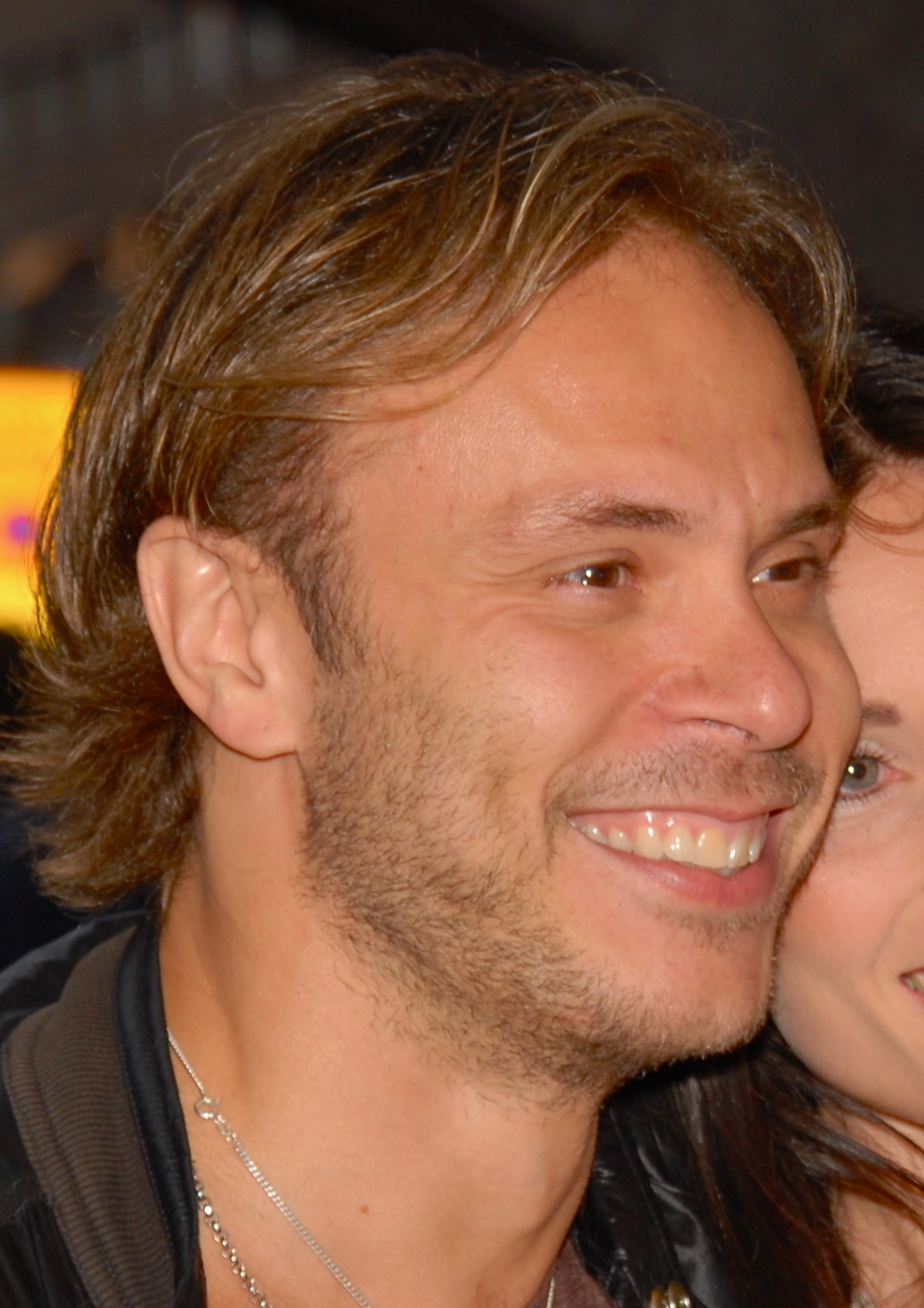
- Bengtsson in 2011
- Born: 28 October 1972 (age 53); Malmö, Sweden
- Occupation: Actor

Björn Mikael Bengtsson (born 28 October 1972 in Malmö) is a Swedish actor.

== Biography ==
Bengtsson studied at Gothenburg Theatre Academy 1993–96. He has worked at Malmö City Theatre, Helsingborg City Theatre and the National Swedish Touring Theatre.

Bengtsson portrayed Sigefrid in BBC America and BBC Two's historical drama series The Last Kingdom.

== Filmography ==
=== Film ===
Year	Title	Role	Notes
1999	Gertrud	Erland Jansson	TV film
2001	Fru Marianne	Walter	TV film
2002	Hot Dog	Simon	
2003	Kontorstid	Tomas	
2003	Without You	Björn	Short film
2004	Kyla		TV film
2005	Horsing Around	Bingochefen	
2006	Moreno and the Silence	Jaan Blauvelt	
2006	Svalan, Katten, Rosen, Döden	Jaan Blauvelt	Direct-to-video
2006	Offside	Peter	
2006	Istedgade	Robert	
2007	En spricka i kristallen	Richard	TV film
2008	Mellan oss	Jonas	Short film
2008	Rallybrudar	Kenta	
2009	Scenes from a Celebrity Life	Björn Bengtsson	
2009	Psalm 21	Olle Lidman	
2009	The Grief	Thomas	
2009	The Stonecutter	Niklas Klinga	TV film
2010	Dödsboet	Benny Mäklare	Short film
2010	Bröderna Karlsson	Nicklas & Hasse	
2010	+	Dad	Short film, voice role
2011	Någon annanstans i Sverige	Janne	
2013	Julie	Jean	
2014	Raspberry Boat Refugee	Rille	
2015	Ur askan i elden	Jack	Direct-to-video
2015	Tyst diplomati	Jack	Direct-to-video
2015	Happy Hour in Paradise	DJ Hawk	
2015	Blodsdiamanter	Jack	Direct-to-video
2015	Heaven on Earth	Jonas	
2018	Robin Hood	Crusader Tydon	
2018	Operation Ragnarok	Lieutenant Ehrenstrahl	
2019	The Perfect Patient	Sven Åke Christianson	
2020	Passagen	Lillebror	Short film
2021	Eva & Adam	Eva's pappa	

=== Television ===
Year	Title	Role	Notes
2000	Fem gånger Storm	Torbjörn	Episode: "Series 1, Episode 2"
2003	Ramona	Per Ulrik Kernell	Miniseries, 2 episodes
2006	Beck	Daniel Orrberg	Episode: "The Scorpion"
2006	Snapphanar	Roosman	Miniseries, 3 episodes
2007–2008	Labyrint	Jonny Johansson	Series regular, 12 episodes
2008	Sthlm	Claes	Episode: "Faruk"
2010	Himmelblå	Thomas	Recurring role, 5 episodes
2011	Bibliotekstjuven	P-O	Miniseries, 3 episodes
2012	30 Degrees in February	Bengt Jr.	Recurring role, 6 episodes
2014–2020	Thicker Than Water	Lars Waldemar	Series regular, 27 episodes
2017	The Last Kingdom	Sigefrid	Series regular, 8 episodes
2018	Rig 45	Pontus	Series regular, 6 episodes
2018	Conspiracy of Silence	Henrik Hammarlund	Series regular, 7 episodes
2021	The Unlikely Murderer	Thomas Pettersson	Miniseries, 4 episodes
2023	A Nearly Normal Family	Adam Sandell	Miniseries, 6 episodes
TBA	Blood Cruise		Filming
