= Don't Click (2020 film) =

2020 Canadian horror film

- Film poster
- Directed by: G-Hey Kim
- Written by: Courtney Ellum
- Produced by: Courtney Ellum; George Mihalka; Bill Marks
- Starring: Valter Skarsgård; Mark Koufos; Catherine Howard; Geoff Mays; May Grehan
- Cinematography: Russ De Jong
- Edited by: Mike Gallant
- Music by: Lora Bidner
- Release date: August 29, 2020 (FrightFest)
- Running time: 90 minutes
- Country: Canada
- Language: English

Don't Click is a 2020 Canadian horror film that was directed by G-Hey Kim. It screened online at the 2020 FrightFest and stars Valter Skarsgård as a young man who is forced into a nightmarish reality after viewing a snuff film.

The film is based on a 2017 short film by the same name created by Kim.

== Synopsis ==
Josh is pulled into a nightmarish room in purgatory after watching a torture porn video featuring a man torturing a woman named Maya on his roommate Zane's open laptop. He's forced by Salary Man, a man in a business suit, to torture his friend Zane before he is briefly returned to the apartment, but is returned to the room after watching additional footage on the laptop. This time the room shows him the remainder of the footage where the man brutalizes Maya before murdering her via strangulation, revealing that it was specifically a snuff film. Salary Man forces Josh to continue torturing Zane, during which Josh notices that Maya was watching.

Josh returns to the apartment and tries to avoid returning to purgatory by destroying the laptop, but to no avail as the laptop reappears and shows more footage. Once again in purgatory, Josh realizes that he and Zane were sent there for viewing the video. He confronts Maya, saying that he doesn't belong there. He is in turn confronted by flashbacks showing that Josh was aware of Zane's addiction to torture porn and that it was becoming too extreme, but did nothing to stop him. She also reveals that she gained the ability to draw in viewers after her blood splashed on the modem. She then brought in her torturer, revealed to be Salary Man. Together they force Josh to torture Zane one final time before both Josh and Zane are returned to reality. Any potential relief is short lived when Maya appears and kills Josh, forcing him to take the place of Salary Man as she goes on to torture more people.

== Cast ==
- Valter Skarsgård as Josh
- Mark Koufos as Zane
- Catherine Howard as Maya
- Geoff Mays as The Salary Man
- May Grehan as Shannon
- Samantha Hart as Red Headed Woman
- Dayjan Lesmond as Dom-Man
- Derrick Rabethge as Dom-Teacher
- Erica Sherwood as School Girl

== Production ==
In 2017, G-Hey Kim released a short video, "Don't Click", at that year's Hamilton Film Festival in Canada. She was later contacted by George Mihalka about expanding the short into a feature length film, something that she did not believe would have been possible for her due to the limited amount of shorts that are turned into full films. Kim had previously attended one of Mihalka's classes on filmmaking and had created the short as an assignment, something she credits as partially responsible for him reaching out. She has stated that the film is intended to serve as a warning about the risks that come with an increased use of internet and technology, drawing a comparison to the Nth room case.

Courtney McAllister was brought on to write the script and produced alongside Mihalka and Bill Marks. It was produced via Marks's Vortex Words + Pictures and Valter Skarsgård was named as one of the film's lead characters. Filming took place in spring of 2019 in Hamilton, Ontario, Canada.

== Release ==
Don't Click had its world premiere on August 29, 2020 at the digital edition of FrightFest. It received a limited theatrical release and was also released on VOD on December 11 of the same year.

== Reception ==
Culture Crypt and Flickering Myth were critical of Don't Click, criticizing the scenes of gore and violence as boring. Culture Crypt joked on the film's title, writing that "The movie’s title doubles as a glib review. The movie’s tagline does too. “Some Things You Can’t Unsee.” “Don’t Click” is one of those things, although you’ll desperately wish it weren’t." Kim Newman had similar criticisms, stating that the film "gets bogged down in forced stuff about the lead characters’ relationship, and goes through the numbing routine of torture porn a decade and a half after everyone got the point."

In contrast, CineVue rated Don't Click four out of five stars, writing that it "look[s] back to the era of New French Extremity cinema, such as Demonlover and Martyrs, but also to early noughties J-horror, the Saw franchise, Eli Roth's Hostel series, and does so with a furrowed brow and concerned look".
