= National Society for Road Safety =

Road traffic safety organization in Sweden

- Nationalföreningen för trafiksäkerhetens främjande
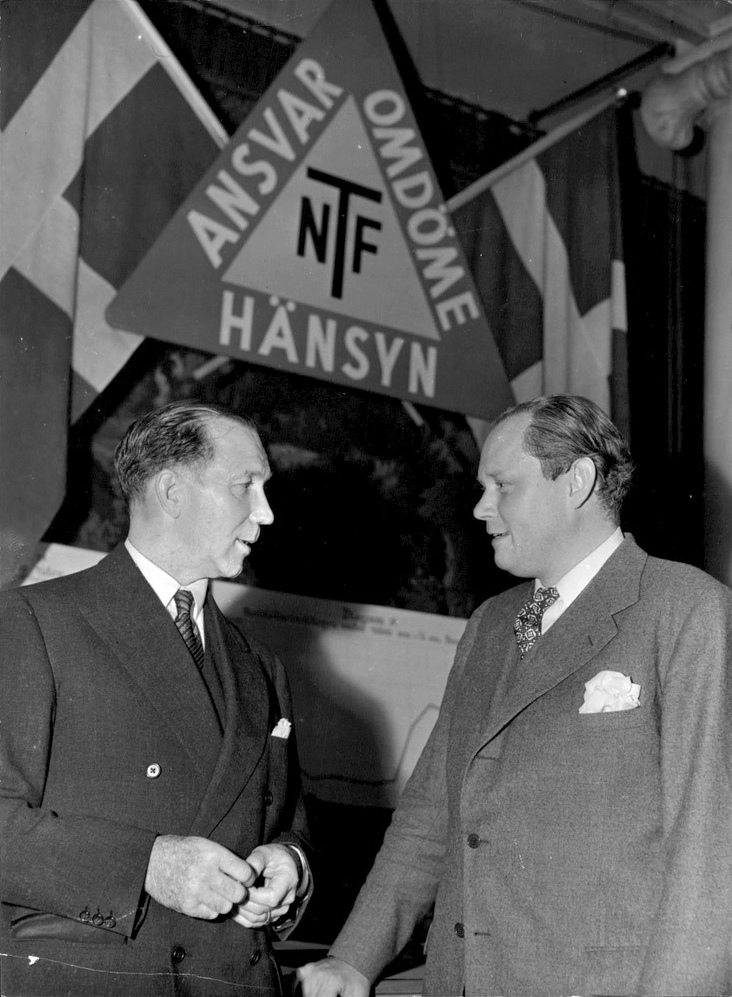
- Two delegates at a NTF meeting in September 1951
- Formation: 1934
- Headquarters: Solna, Sweden
- Official language: Swedish

The National Society for Road Safety (Swedish: Nationalföreningen för trafiksäkerhetens främjande; NTF) is a road traffic safety organization in Sweden. It was established in 1934.
