= To Kill a Child (2003 film) =

2003 Swedish-Finnish short film

- Att döda ett barn
- Directed by: Alexander Skarsgård; Björne Larson
- Written by: Alexander Skarsgård; Björne Larson
- Based on: To Kill a Child by Stig Dagerman
- Produced by: Anna Knochenhauer
- Starring: Valter Skarsgård; Christer Fjellström; Evalena Ljung Kjellberg; Jonas Sjöqvist; Sofia Zouagui
- Narrated by: Stellan Skarsgård
- Cinematography: John Christian Rosenlund
- Edited by: Kristin Grundström
- Music by: Mario Adamson
- Production company: Björne Larson AB
- Distributed by: Björne Larson Film; Film i Väst
- Release dates: January 25, 2003 (Sweden, Gothenburg Film Festival)
- Running time: 8 minutes
- Countries: Finland; Sweden
- Language: Swedish

To Kill a Child (Swedish: Att döda ett barn) is a 2003 Swedish-Finnish short drama film written and directed by Alexander Skarsgård and Björne Larson, and based on Stig Dagerman's novella Att döda ett barn.

== Plot ==
A man is on his way to the ocean. A child is running through a backyard. In four minutes their fates will intertwine. One life will be changed forever whilst the other's flame will burn out.

== About the film ==
The film premiered on 7 February 2003 and has also been shown on Swedish Television.

== Cast ==
- Valter Skarsgård - The Child
- Christer Fjellström - The Father
- Evalena Ljung Kjellberg - The Mother
- Jonas Sjöqvist - The Man
- Sofia Zouagui - The Woman
- Stellan Skarsgård - Narrator

== Awards ==
- 2003 Odense International Film Festival - Grand Prix: Alexander Skarsgård and Björne Larson
- 2003 Odense International Film Festival - Press Award: Alexander Skarsgård and Björne Larson
