= Hällekis =

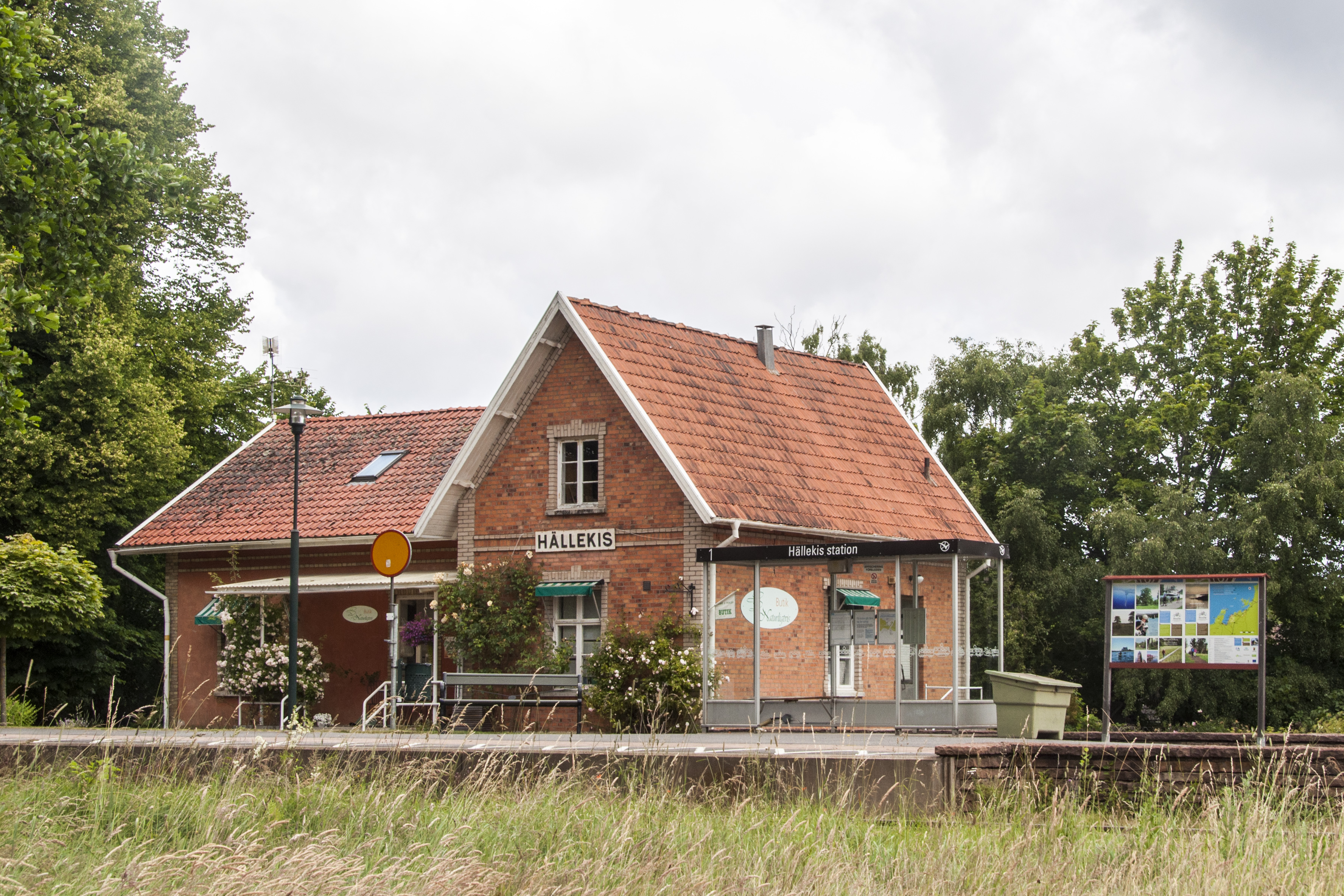
- Hällekis railway station

- Location within Västra Götaland Location within Sweden
- Coordinates: 58°37′N 13°26′E
- Country: Sweden
- Province: Västergötland
- County: Västra Götaland County
- Municipality: Götene Municipality

Area
  - Total: 1.85 km^{2} (0.71 sq mi)

Population (31 December 2010)
  - Total: 704
  - Density: 381/km^{2} (990/sq mi)
- Time zone: UTC+1 (CET)
  - Summer (DST): UTC+2 (CEST)

Hällekis (Swedish pronunciation: [ˈhɛ̂lːɛˌɕiːs]) is a locality situated in Götene Municipality, Västra Götaland County, Sweden. It had 704 inhabitants in 2010 compared to 904 in 1960, a decline due to the closure of the main employer.

== Location ==
The village is situated on the coast of Lake Vänern to the north of Mount Kinnekulle with a 306 m (1,004 ft) ridge and large nature reserve. The nearest large towns are Mariestad and Lidköping, both about 20 miles (32 km) north-east and south-west respectively, with which it is connected by a light rail link.

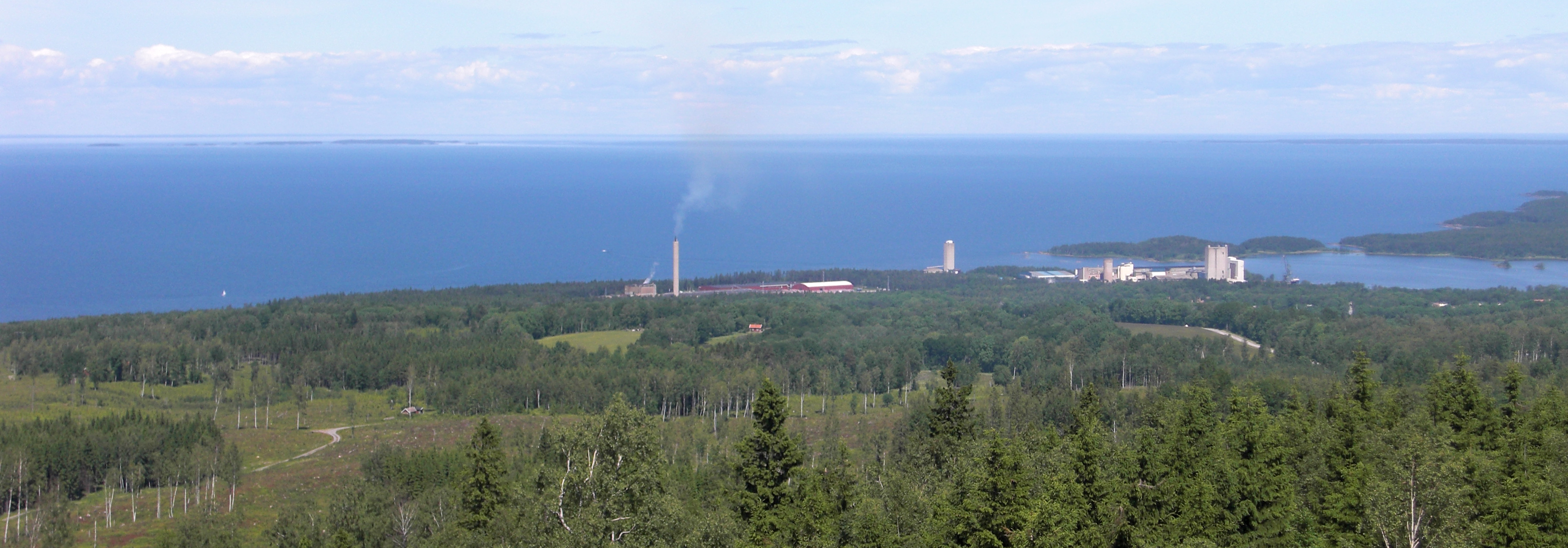
Hällekis with its industries viewed from Mount Kinnekulle

== History ==
A mill was established in the village in the 18th century. With the availability of limestone nearby this was developed into a cement plant purchased in 1913 by Skånska Cement, the mother company of AB Skånska Cementgjuteriet, now known as Skanska. The factory closed in 1979.

On the outskirts of the village is the manor Hönsäter of which the most famous owner was Swedish military commander Harald Stake (1598-1677). The current main building dates back to 1667 but was remodelled in 1807. The manor was previously owned by Skånska Cement but is now privately owned.

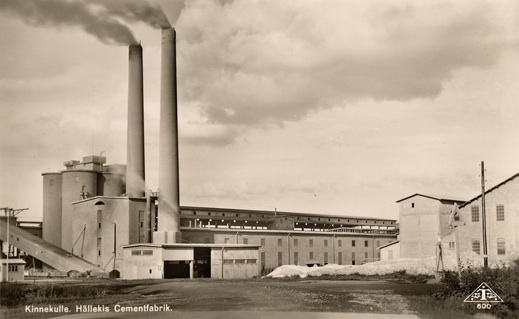
The cement factory ca.1950

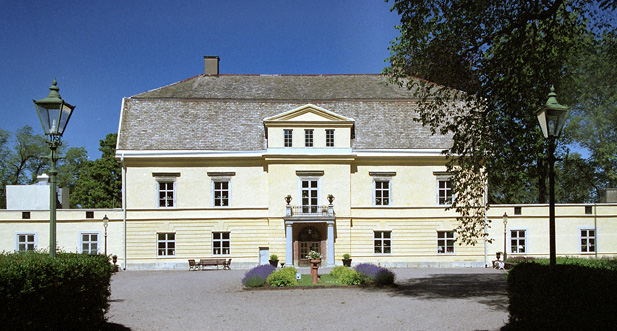
Hönsäter manor

== See also ==
- Swedish version
