= Susan Skarsgard =

American graphic designer and calligrapher (born 1954)

- Born: 1954 (age 71–72); Ann Arbor, Michigan
- Education: University of Michigan School of Art and Design
- Occupations: Graphic designer, calligrapher, writer
- Employer: General Motors

Susan Skarsgard (born 1954) is an American graphic designer, calligrapher and writer known internationally for her calligraphy as well as her work as a designer and founder of the GM Design Archive & Special Collections at General Motors. In 2019, she authored Where Today Meets Tomorrow, Eero Saarinen and the General Motors Technical Center, published by Princeton Architectural Press.

== Early life and education ==
Susan Skarsgard was born in Detroit, Michigan. Her early studies in Renaissance and Baroque music inspired an interest in calligraphy which, initially, she taught herself. She went on to study calligraphy in Austria under Friedrich Neugebauer. Skarsgard holds an MFA from the University of Michigan School of Art and Design.

== Career ==
Before joining General Motors in 1995, Skarsgard worked in the Detroit design studio founded by Jerry Campbell and Dick Isbell. At General Motors, Skarsgard applied her knowledge of letterforms to emblems and nameplates for cars and trucks. In 2006, she designed a one-of-a-kind book commemorating the 50th anniversary of the General Motors Technical Center. This project lead to the creation of a new department called the GM Design Archive & Special Collections which is the official repository for the history of design at General Motors. In 2019, Skarsgard authored Where Today Meets Tomorrow, an historical account of the design and construction of the iconic General Motors Technical Center designed by mid-century architect Eero Saarinen. The book was included on the annual Michigan Notable Books list.

In addition to her career at General Motors, Skarsgard has maintained an active practice as a calligrapher, working in both traditional and digital media. In 2009, she published Twenty-six of 26, an exploration of letterforms as art. According to Paul Shaw, "Skarsgard’s alphabets are not simply collections of 26 letters but compositions that explore shape, negative space, rhythm, pattern, colour, texture and perception," and are "light years removed from what is popularly thought of as calligraphy." Her work has been featured in several exhibitions including those held at the Grolier Club and the San Francisco Library. Her Pop-up Alphabet book can be found in the rare book collections of the Library of Congress and the University of Michigan Library.

== Publications and exhibits ==
- Where Today Meets Tomorrow: Eero Saarinen and the General Motors Technical Center. Susan Skarsgard. Princeton Architectural Press. 1999
- Twenty-six of 26. Limited-edition portfolio. 2009.
- Pop-up Alphabet Book. Limited-edition artist book. 2002.
- The Calligraphy Revival, 1906–2016, group exhibition, Grolier Club, New York, 2017.
- At the Junction: Calligraphic Design, solo exhibition, 2009, Washtenaw Community College, Ann Arbor, Michigan.
- Imagine/Align, site-specific, community-based art installation of 20,000 daffodils, 2004, University of Michigan Nichols Arboretum.
- An archive of her papers is held in the Newberry Library, Chicago, Illinois
