= Valter Skarsgård =

Swedish actor (born 1995)

- Born: 25 October 1995 (age 30); Stockholm, Sweden
- Occupation: Actor
- Years active: 2003–present
- Father: Stellan Skarsgård
- Relatives: Alexander Skarsgård (brother); Gustaf Skarsgård (brother); Bill Skarsgård (brother); Kolbjörn Skarsgård (half-brother)

Valter Skarsgård (Swedish: [ˈvǎlːtɛr ˈskɑ̌ːʂɡoːɖ]; born 25 October 1995) is a Swedish actor, a member of the Skarsgård acting family that includes his father, Stellan, and brothers Alexander, Gustaf, Bill, and Kolbjörn.

== Early life and education ==
Valter Skarsgård was born on 25 October 1995 in Stockholm, Sweden. He is the youngest son of actor Stellan Skarsgård and My Skarsgård, a physician. He has seven siblings, five of whom are from his father's first marriage: Alexander, Gustaf, Sam, Bill, and Eija. He has two half-brothers, Ossian and Kolbjörn, from his father's second marriage. Alexander, Gustaf, Bill, and Kolbjörn are all also actors.

Skarsgård studied at St. Erik's High School.

== Career ==
As an actor, Skarsgård has mainly appeared in Swedish or other Scandinavian productions. His first roles came as a child through his acting family: in 2003, he appeared in the short film To Kill a Child, written and directed by his brother Alexander, and in Details as the younger version of his brother Gustaf's role. In 2007's Arn: The Knight Templar, he and Bill played the sons of Knut Eriksson, played by Gustaf.

He had his first lead part in the 2013 film IRL and his first main television role in the series Black Lake, which ran from 2016 to 2018. He later portrayed the metal musician Bård Guldvik "Faust" Eithun in the 2018 film Lords of Chaos. This was followed by two horror film leads, in Don't Click and Funhouse. During 2021 and 2022, he became known to global audience in several Netflix shows, including Katla and The Playlist. In 2023, he played the ice hockey player Börje Salming in the biopic series Börje.

== Selected filmography ==
=== Film ===
List of film appearances, with year, title, and role shown
| Year | Title | Role | Notes | Ref. |
|---|---|---|---|---|
| 2003 | Details | Daniel (young) | | |
| 2003 | To Kill a Child | The Child | Short film | |
| 2007 | Arn: The Knight Templar | Jon | | |
| 2008 | Arn – The Kingdom at Road's End | Jon | | |
| 2013 | IRL | Elias | | |
| 2018 | Lords of Chaos | Bård Guldvik "Faust" Eithun | | |
| 2019 | Don't Click | Josh | | |
| 2020 | Funhouse | Kaspar | | |

=== Television ===
List of television appearances, with year, title, and role shown
| Year | Title | Role | Notes | Ref. |
|---|---|---|---|---|
| 2016–18 | Black Lake | Lippi | 16 episodes | |
| 2020 | Morden i Sandhamn | Micke | 2 episodes | |
| 2021 | Katla | Björn | 5 episodes | |
| 2021 | Zebrarummet | Hugo | 8 episodes | |
| 2021–present | Beck | Vilhelm Beck | 3 episodes | |
| 2023 | Börje | Börje Salming | 5 episodes | |
| 2024 | STHLM Blackout | Albin Olsson | 4 episodes | |
