= Flag of the Republic of Jamtland =

Flag of humorous micronation in Jämtland

Flag of the Republic of Jamtland

The flag of the Republic of Jamtland was created in 1983 by activists Kent Backman and Bo Oscarsson as a horizontal tricolor of blue, white and green, symbolising the sky, snow-clad mountains and woodland. (The three bands also symbolise the provinces of the Republic of Jamtland: Jamtland, Härjedalen and Ragunda.)

On the white band is an old seal granted to Jamtland by king Magnus Lagabøte of Norway in the 13th century. The seal reads SIGILLUM:COMMUNITATIS:DE:IEMThALANDIA, "seal of the community of Jamtland", and depicts two women holding a shield (uncrowned) with the Norwegian state lion and two hunters with bows hunting squirrels in trees. (Winter fur from squirrels (vair) was an important merchandise in medieval times.) The seal was in official use up to 1570.

The flag has no legal/official status but has become popular in Jamtland and among the Jamtlandic diaspora in Sweden. Republic statues designate 12 March, 16 June, 23 July and 23 December as flag days: 23 July commemorates the first official 1983 flying of the flag, 12 March is the National Day, 16 June commemorates the national assembly day abolished by Swedish occupation in the 17th century, and 23 December is Sjursmäss ("Sigurd's mass"), a local holiday originally celebrating a saint now forgotten.

== See also ==
- The Doug flag is a similar tricolor where the colors also represent sky, snow caps and woodland.
