= To Kill a Child (1953 film) =

- Att döda ett barn
- Directed by: Gösta Werner
- Written by: Stig Dagerman
- Based on: Att döda ett barn by Stig Dagerman
- Starring: Karl-Erik Forsgårdh; Marie-Anne Condé; Georg Årlin; Sissi Kaiser; Kerstin Thörn; Sten Larsson
- Narrated by: Gunnar Sjöberg
- Cinematography: Sten Dahlgren
- Edited by: Gösta Werner
- Music by: Rudolf Nelson; Walter Joseph
- Production company: Minerva Film AB
- Release date: August 27, 1953 (Sweden)
- Running time: 9 minutes
- Country: Sweden
- Language: Swedish

To Kill a Child (Swedish: Att döda ett barn) is a Swedish short film from 1953 that was based on the novella by Stig Dagerman with the same name. The film shows how a man hits a child with his car.

The film was made in the summer of 1952 in Haväng, Skåne, and was first screened on 31 October 1952 in Uppsala Studenternas Filmstudio, but did not officially premiere until 27 August 1953. The film was allowed from 15 years of age and up.

== Cast ==
- Karl-Erik Forsgårdh - The Driver
- Marie-Anne Condé - The Woman In The Car
- Georg Årlin - The Child's Father
- Sissi Kaiser - The Child's Mother
- Kerstin Thörn - The Child
- Sten Larsson - The Man By The Gas Station

== Music ==
- Springtime Romance by Rudolf Nelson, instrumental
- Nosegay by Walter Joseph, instrumental
