= Billey Shamrock =

Entertainer, singer, comedian, actor, composer and writer

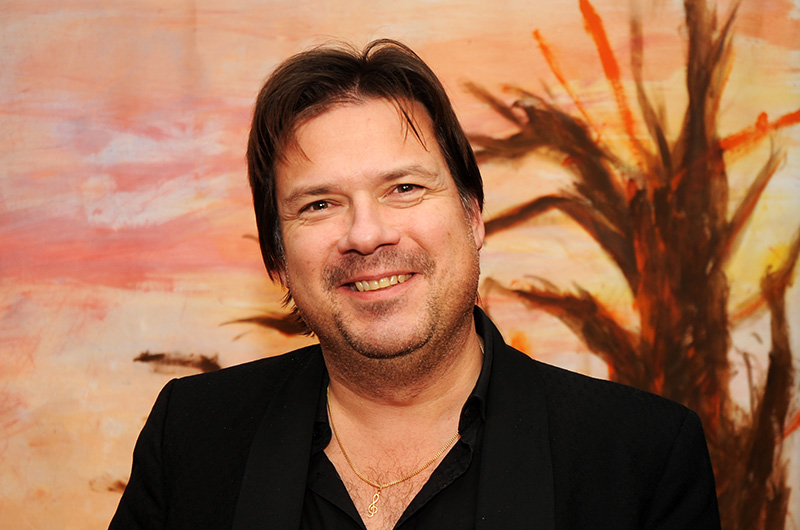
Billey Shamrock on 26 November 2014.

Billey Shamrock Gleissner (born in Solberga, Stockholm, Sweden) is an entertainer, singer, comedian, actor, composer and writer.

Starting off with youth theatre, he formed his first rock band, The Naughty Fiddlers, in 1979 and later that year his first poems were published. In 1982 his first 7" was released – Super Swede/People. His first solo CD was Billey, released in 1995. His latest album is Billeys ljusa sida (The light side of Billey).

As a full-time artist he has since 1990 been on Swedish national TV several times. 1993–1996 he participated in the musical Jesus Christ Superstar (staged by D. Kronlund) and in 1998 in the musical Hair in Stockholm. Alone or with colleges he has toured Sweden, Norway, Finland and the Baltic countries. He is registered for 146 written lyrics/compositions. He is the vice president of the Society of professional troubadours of Sweden and a member of SKAP, Sweden's Composers of Popular music. In 2005 he was the grand master of the Swedish edition of Jeopardy!.
