= Bill Skarsgård =

Swedish actor

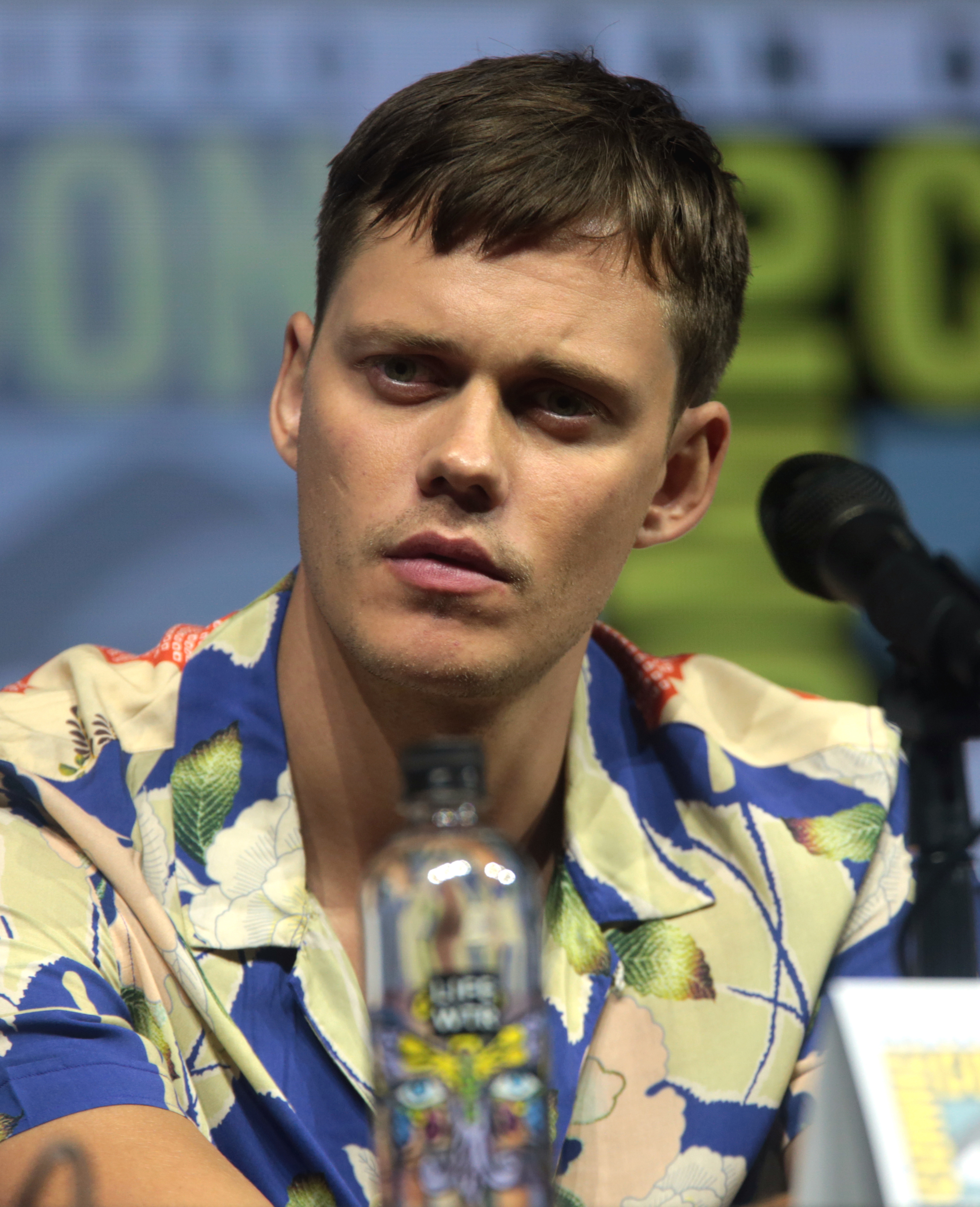
- Skarsgård at the 2018 San Diego Comic Con
- Born: Bill Istvan Günther Skarsgård; 9 August 1990; Stockholm, Sweden
- Education: Södra Latin
- Occupations: Actor; producer; director
- Years active: 2000–present
- Partner: Alida Morberg
- Children: 2
- Father: Stellan Skarsgård
- Relatives: Alexander Skarsgård (brother); Gustaf Skarsgård (brother); Valter Skarsgård (brother); Kolbjörn Skarsgård (half-brother)

Bill Istvan Günther Skarsgård (Swedish: [ˈbɪlː ˈskɑ̌ːʂɡoːɖ]; born 9 August 1990) is a Swedish actor and filmmaker. He is best known for portraying Pennywise the Dancing Clown in the horror films It (2017) and It Chapter Two (2019) and the television series It: Welcome to Derry (2025–present) and Count Orlok in Nosferatu (2024). His directorial debut was a short film in 2022. In 2025 he starred in the critically-acclaimed crime thriller Dead Man's Wire, directed by Gus Van Sant.

Skarsgård started his career as a child actor, starring in White Water Fury (2000), alongside his brother Alexander. After pursuing an education at Södra Latin, he landed his first major role in Simple Simon (2010). He gained international recognition as main role in Hemlock Grove (2013–2015). His first major American role was in the Robert Schwentke-directed dystopian The Divergent Series: Allegiant (2016).

Skarsgård has received multiple awards and nominations, including a Satellite Award and a Berlinale Award. He received multiple nominations for his role as Pennywise in It (2017), including a nominated Saturn Award for Best Supporting Actor, a nominated MTV Movie Award for Best Villain, and a nominated Teen Choice Award for Choice Movie Villain.

== Early life ==
Bill Istvan Günther Skarsgård was born in 1990 or 1991 in Stockholm, Sweden, the son of actor Stellan Skarsgård and physician My Skarsgård. He has seven siblings, including actors Alexander, Gustaf, Valter, and Kolbjörn.

== Career ==
=== 2000–2016: Early work ===
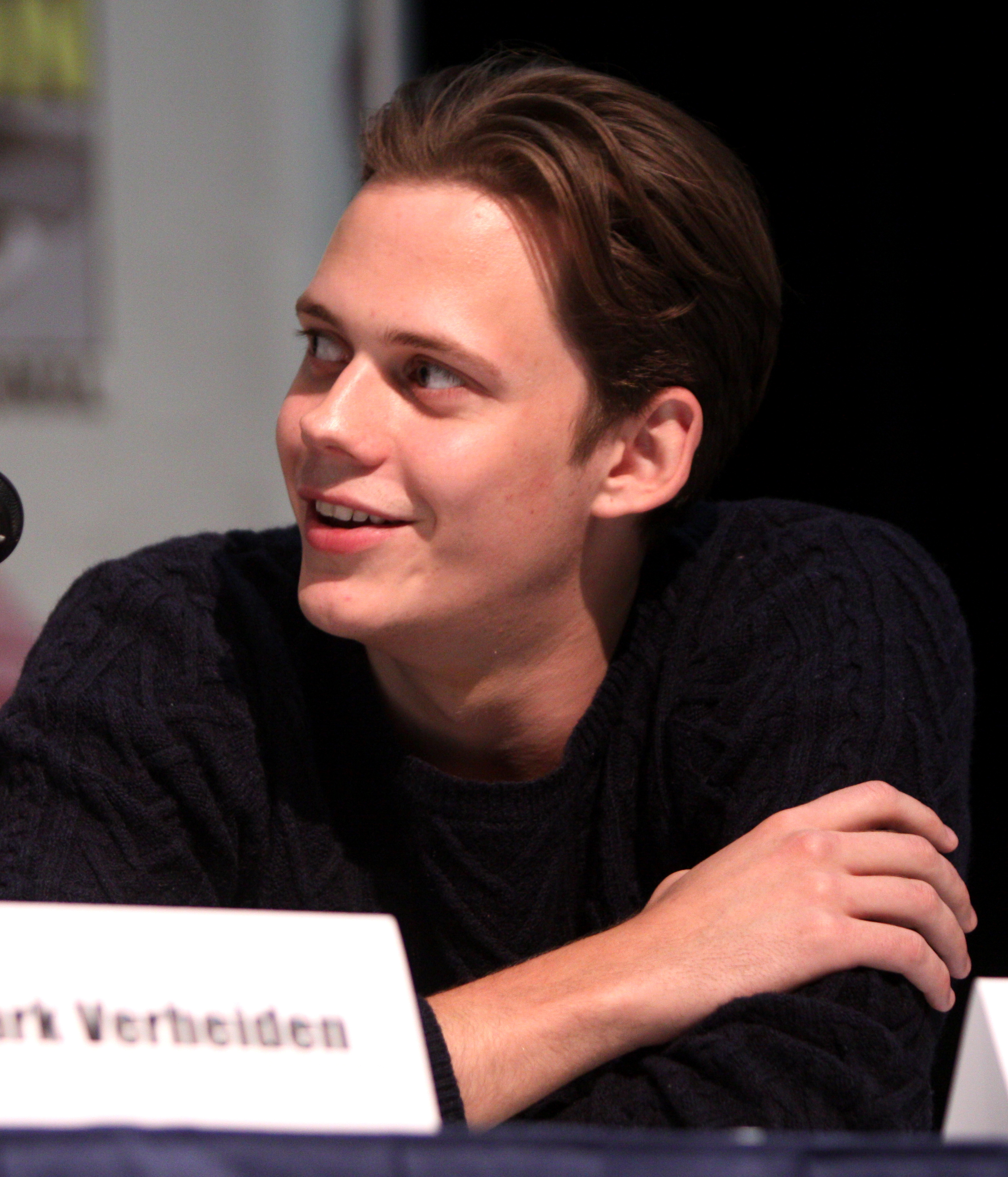
Skarsgård at the 2013 San Diego Comic-Con

In 2011, Skarsgård was nominated for a Guldbagge Award for his leading role as Simon in Simple Simon. At the age of 21, he won the European Film Academy's Shooting Stars Award in 2012. Beginning in 2013, Skarsgård played the role of Roman Godfrey in the Netflix original Hemlock Grove.

In April 2014, Skarsgård featured on the cover of Hero – a bi-annual men's fashion and culture magazine, shot by Hedi Slimane. In the issue, he is interviewed by his father. Skarsgård played Matthew in the science fiction thriller The Divergent Series: Allegiant (2016), his first major American film.

=== 2017–2021: Breakthrough ===
Skarsgård portrayed Pennywise the Dancing Clown in the 2017 film adaptation of Stephen King's It and reprised the role later in the 2019 sequel It: Chapter Two, as well as in the 2025 prequel series It: Welcome to Derry, directed by Andy Muschietti. Speaking about what led him to casting Skarsgård, Muschietti said: "One second he can act all cute, and then the next, there's something ancestral and dark that just appears. His ability to transform is mind-blowing to me."

Skarsgård was a series regular on 2018's Castle Rock, as a young man with an unusual legal problem. That same year, he portrayed the minor role of Zeitgeist in Deadpool 2. In 2020, he played Mateo in episode 4 of AMC's anthology series Soulmates. In 2021, he voiced the main antagonist Kro in Eternals.

=== 2022–present: filmmaking and major roles ===
Skarsgård made his directorial debut with a satirical short film titled Soul of a Man. Based on a short story by Edgar Allan Poe, the film starred several family members and premiered in February 2022. In the 2022 Netflix miniseries Clark, Skarsgård portrayed Clark Olofsson, the notorious Swedish criminal whose involvement in the Norrmalmstorg robbery gave rise to the term Stockholm syndrome.

In 2023, Skarsgård played the lead villain role of Marquis de Gramont in John Wick: Chapter 4.

In 2024, Skarsgård began taking on more leading man roles and was the titular character in Boy Kills World. He then starred in the 2024 reboot The Crow, directed by Rupert Sanders. Skarsgård said: "I had a great shoot, a lot of night shoots. … You're kind of preoccupied in a bleak state of mind for a while. I like to be consumed by it when I'm doing it. Actually, we were working out a lot, I found it really helpful. There's nothing like being tired and sweaty to get the demons out." Finally, he co-starred as the vampire Count Orlok in the remake of Nosferatu, directed by Robert Eggers. To play the part, Skarsgård worked with an opera coach to lower his vocal register, adapted a Transylvanian accent and wore 60 prosthetics. Speaking on his experience portraying the titular role, Skarsgård said: "It was like conjuring pure evil. It took a while for me to shake off the demon that had been conjured inside of me." Nicholas Hoult, Skarsgård's co-star in the film, said "it's really a wonderful character and he did beautiful character work with it."

Skarsgård's roles as monsters and other non-human characters have led him to be described as a creature actor by media sources.

In 2025, Skarsgård starred in Locked. He said performing alone and the "street weasel quality" of his character drew him to the part and added: "I read the script for Locked around the tail end of Nosferatu production ... I often instinctively want to go somewhere that's the polar opposite of my current project, just to keep challenging myself." He then starred in the critically-acclaimed crime thriller Dead Man's Wire, directed by Gus Van Sant. Speaking about taking on his role in the film, Skarsgård said: "It was very juicy and it's a character that I was so blessed with: very complex, fun and dynamic, and [it required] a type of performance I certainly haven't done in America before... There's no blocking, there are no real hit marks (and) that presents accidents and spontaneous things. You feel very free." Skarsgård's performance in the film was praised, with William Bibbiani of TheWrap calling him "brilliant" and writing "Skarsgård is a captivating chaos gremlin... he's such a chameleon..." David Rooney of The Hollywood Reporter deemed it his best work so far and said it was "a crackling performance full of unforced humor". Co-star Dacre Montgomery commented on working with Skarsgard: "I just can't say enough good things about Bill. He's wonderful. He's the best friend I've made on a set. He's one of the best scene partners I've ever had. He gives it his all." In 2026, Skarsgård co-star opposite Hugh Jackman in The Death of Robin Hood as Little John. Skarsgård started shooting the film only three days after wrapping Dead Man's Wire; he shaved his head and did a Yorkshire accent for his part. Skarsgård also appeared in The Mosquito Bowl.

On 17 September 2026, Skarsgård was announced to be playing the lead character in Hideo Kojima's upcoming video game Physint. Skarsgård will star in Lords of War as the son of Nicolas Cage's character.

== Personal life ==
Skarsgård is in a relationship with actress Alida Morberg. In October 2018, the couple had their first child. They had a second child in 2023.

In February 2024, Skarsgård was arrested and fined for cannabis possession in Sweden.

== Filmography ==
=== Film ===
Key
†	Denotes films that have not yet been released

Year	Title	Role	Notes
2000	White Water Fury	Klasse	
2008	Pigan brinner!	Tonårs-Nosferatu	
2008	Arn – The Kingdom at Road's End	Erik	
2009	Kenny Begins	Pontus	
2010	Simple Simon	Simon	
2010	Behind Blue Skies	Martin	
2011	The Crown Jewels	Richard Persson	
2011	Simon & the Oaks	Simon	
2012	Anna Karenina	Captain Makhotin	
2013	Victoria	Otto	
2016	The Divergent Series: Allegiant	Matthew	
2017	Atomic Blonde	Merkel	
2017	Do You Like the Taste of Beer	Man	
2017	It	Pennywise the Dancing Clown	
2017	Battlecreek	Henry Pearl	
2017	Moomins and the Winter Wonderland	Moomintroll	Voice
2018	Assassination Nation	Mark	
2018	Deadpool 2	Axel Cluney / Zeitgeist	
2019	Villains	Mickey	
2019	It: Chapter Two	Pennywise the Dancing Clown / Bob Gray	
2020	Nine Days	Kane	
2020	The Devil All the Time	Willard Russell	
2021	Naked Singularity	Dane	
2021	Eternals	Kro	Voice
2022	Barbarian	Keith Toshko	Also executive producer
2022	Burn All My Letters	Sven Stolpe	
2023	John Wick: Chapter 4	Marquis Vincent de Gramont	
2023	Boy Kills World	Boy	
2024	The Crow	Eric Draven / The Crow	
2024	Nosferatu	Count Orlok	
2025	Locked	Eddie Barrish	
2025	Dead Man's Wire	Tony Kiritsis	
2026	The Death of Robin Hood	Little John	
2026	The Mosquito Bowl	Bob Baumann	
2027	Lords of War †	Anton Orlov	Post-production
TBA	Emperor †	Philip II of Spain	Completed

=== Television ===
Year	Title	Role	Notes
2002	Laura Trenter – Dad, the Policeman	Tony	2 episodes
2009	Livet i Fagervik	Mårten	1 episode
2013–2015	Hemlock Grove	Roman Godfrey	Main role
2018–2019	Castle Rock	Henry Deaver / The Kid (season 1); The Angel (season 2)	Main role (season 1); guest star (season 2)
2020	Soulmates	Mateo	Episode: "Layover"
2022	Clark	Clark Olofsson	Main role
2025–present	It: Welcome to Derry	Pennywise the Dancing Clown / Bob Gray	Main role; 4 episodes; also executive producer

=== Video games ===
Year	Title	Role	Notes
TBA	Physint	TBA	Lead protagonist; performance and voice capture.

== Awards and nominations ==
Year	Nominated work	Association	Category	Result	Ref.
2011	Simple Simon	Guldbagge Awards	Best Actor	Nominated	
2011	Simple Simon	Young Artist Awards	Best Performance in an International Feature Film – Leading Young Actor	Nominated	
2012	Himself	Berlin International Film Festival	Shooting Stars Award	Won	
2017	It	Fright Meter Awards	Best Supporting Actor	Won	
2017	It	Seattle Film Critics Awards	Best Villain	Nominated	
2018	It	Saturn Awards	Best Supporting Actor	Nominated	
2018	It	MTV Movie & TV Awards	Best Villain	Nominated	
2018	It	Teen Choice Awards	Choice Movie Villain	Nominated	
2020	It Chapter Two	Fright Meter Awards	Best Supporting Actor	Nominated	
2020	It Chapter Two	Fright Meter Awards	Best Ensemble Cast	Won	
2024	Nosferatu	8th Astra Film Awards	Best Performance in a Horror or Thriller Film	Nominated	
2024	Nosferatu	Seattle Film Critics Awards	Best Villain	Nominated	
2025	Nosferatu	Satellite Awards	Best Cast – Motion Picture	Won	
2026	It: Welcome to Derry	Saturn Awards	Best Guest Starring Role on Television	Nominated	
