= Storsjöyran =

Swedish music festival

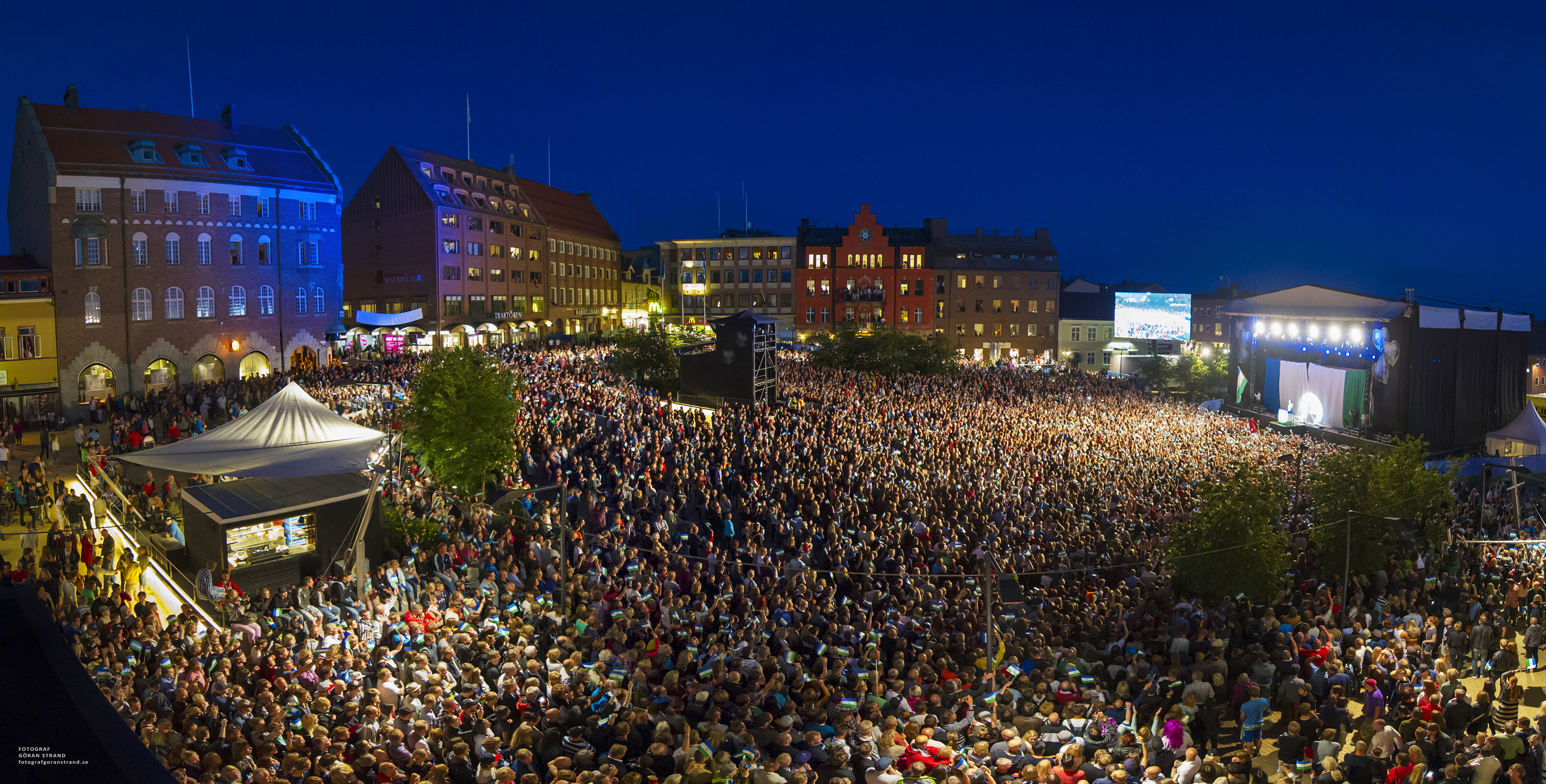

Storsjöyran or just Yran (literal meaning: The Great Lake Giddy Festival) is an annual Swedish musical event going back to the early sixties.

== Festival history ==
The festival was started in honor of the ancient can-do spirit of the people of Jämtland and to show the rest of Sweden that although this region is sparsely populated, its people have the zest, courage and knowledge to create a festival of international size and standard. A goal which they have reached by gathering around 55,000 visitors every year, and it being the second-biggest festival in Sweden (the biggest city festival in Sweden). The festival is held in the middle of Östersund the last weekend of July. Although the event starts the weekend before with the opening of Krogstråket, when regional bars and restaurants gather near the lake.

Jämtland is a self-proclaimed republic (started by the people behind the festival) and has its own president, Ewert Ljusberg, who at precisely midnight on Saturday appears in front of 25,000 people at the town square to deliver his annual speech on the topic of freedom, humanity and solidarity, though the speech usually contains some anti-Swedish government and anti-EU propaganda as well. The president's entrances are usually quite spectacular. In 1996 he rode in on a seven-ton elephant, in 1999 he entered in a huge air balloon that landed at a house roof on the square, and in 2000 he surfed over the crowd to the stage. After his speech the crowd sings the Jamtlandic anthem: "Så tåga vi tillsammans bort" or as it is known in Jamtlandic: "Mæ går på stigom å leit oss opp". Though the Swedish (and original) version of the song is the one that's usually sung.

== The Jamtland Republic ==
Until 1178 the province of Jamtland was an independent, self-governing region, before Norwegian authorities seized control. After the conquest Jamtland still remained semi-autonomous and had the same status within Norway as the possessions overseas until the very late 15th century. Not until 1645 and after several wars and regional conflicts was it ceded to Sweden by Denmark-Norway.

However, through these periods, and today, the people of Jämtland have claimed a strong independence from the southern parts of Sweden and taken deep pride in their own culture, cuisine, and dialects.

== Some of the artists who have performed at Storsjöyran ==
- AC4
- Amy Macdonald
- Alice Cooper
- All Saints
- Anouk
- Antiloop
- April Divine
- Black Rebel Motorcycle Club
- Blondie
- B. B. King
- Bryan Adams
- Buck 65
- Buddy Guy
- Buzzcocks
- Clarence Clemons Temple of Soul
- Clarence "Gatemouth" Brown
- Crash Test Dummies
- Dark Tranquillity
- Del Amitri
- Dizzie Rascal
- Dropkick Murphys
- Ed Harcourt
- Electric Eel Shock
- Europe
- Gogol Bordello
- HammerFall
- Iggy Pop
- In Flames
- Inner Circle
- Jamie Cullum
- Kaizers Orchestra
- Kings Of Leon
- Lady Gaga
- Leningrad Cowboys
- Lillasyster
- Mando Diao
- Melanie C
- Millencolin
- Motörhead
- Neneh Cherry
- Of Montreal
- Phoenix
- Pet Shop Boys
- Pulp
- Saint Etienne
- Siouxsie And The Banshees
- Skunk Anansie
- Solomon Burke
- Starsailor
- Suede
- Takida
- Taraf de Haïdouks
- Texas
- The Cardigans
- The Corrs
- The Ark
- The Darkness
- The Jayhawks
- The Mission
- The Pipettes
- The Pretenders
- The Soundtrack of Our Lives
- Turbonegro
- The Bear Quartet
