= Gábor Palotai =

Swedish–Hungarian designer, artist, graphic designer and typographer

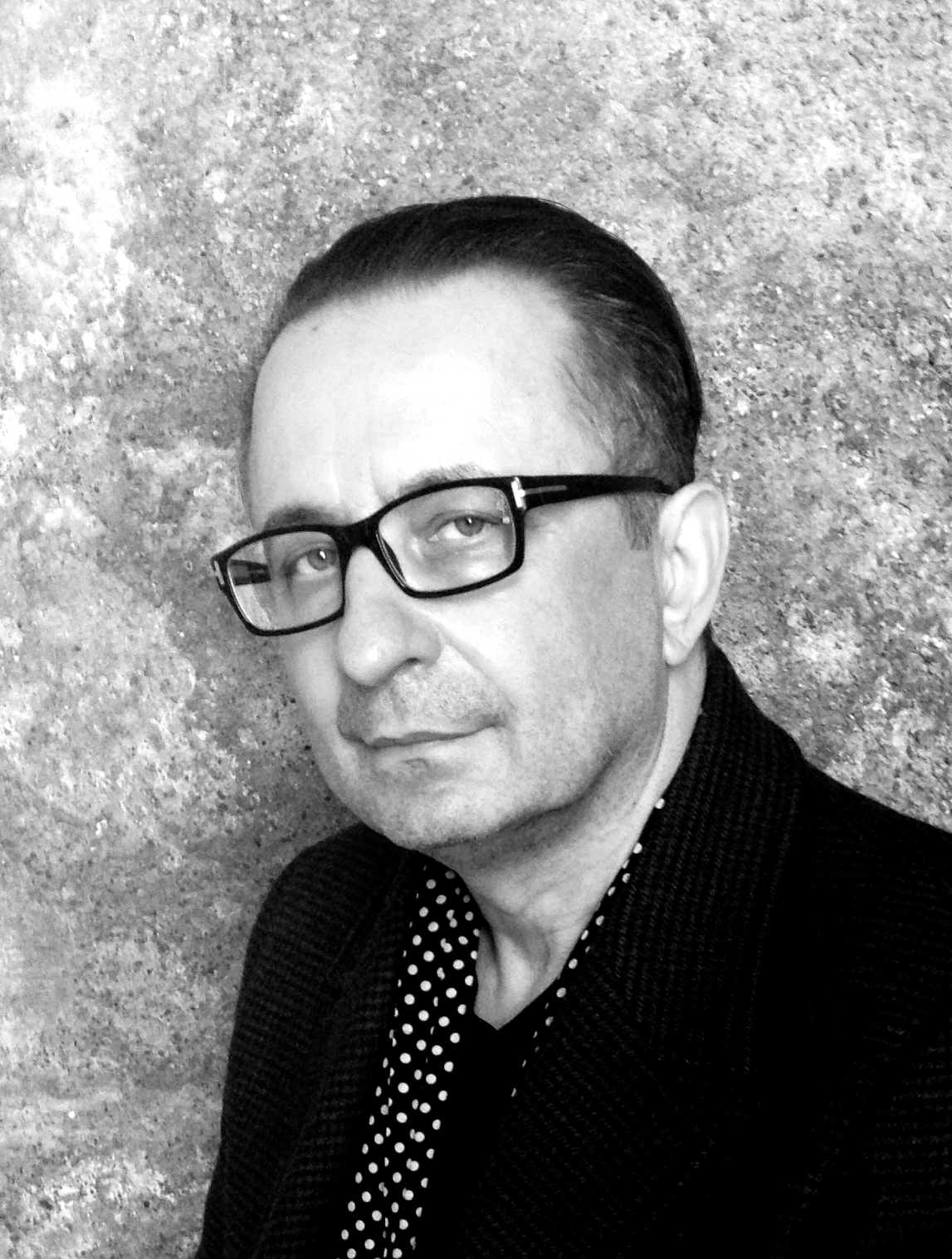
Gábor Palotai

Gábor Palotai is a Swedish–Hungarian designer, artist, graphic designer and typographer. Since 1981, he lives and works in Stockholm, Sweden. Gábor Palotai was born 1956 in Budapest, Hungary, where he also studied and received his MA degree in graphic design at the Moholy-Nagy University of Art and Design (Hungarian Academy of Craft and Design) in Budapest 1976–1980. After his graduation he left Budapest, he moved to Stockholm, where he continued his studies at The Royal Institute of Art, 1981–1983 and Beckmans College of Design, 1983–1984. Gábor Palotai is a member of Alliance Graphique Internationale (AGI) since 2002. AGI unites the world's leading graphic designers. He is also a member of Svenska tecknare (The Association of Swedish Illustrators and Graphic Designers), Konstnärernas riksorganisation (The Swedish Artist's National Organisation), and since 2015, the State Heraldic Board of the National Archives of Sweden. Gábor Palotai is an honorary professor at the Moholy-Nagy University of Art and Design, Budapest, and in 2021 he received the Knight's Cross Order of Merit of Hungary.

== Works ==
Gábor Palotai is working across genres in both art and design. His studio, Gabor Palotai Design, is based in Stockholm, Sweden, since 1987. During the years, his noted world of visual art has been realized in different media: His works operate with a holistic concept of visual culture and therefore his artistic and design practice is completely intertwined. Reflecting his expanded understanding of graphic design, in his consistently formulated oeuvre, besides conventional formats and media, other, hardly classifiable or less common genres are present; such as conceptual photography, graphic design novel, printed textiles, non-narrative digital motion pictures or even public plaques. Gábor Palotai works on a broad range of commissions, art and design projects within the field of visual communication such as corporate design, visual identities, packaging design, profile programmes, logotypes, pictograms, exhibition design, web design, animation, illustration, photography, poster design, album covers, typography and book design. Gábor Palotai's design has rendered him many awards over the years and has been the subject of several books, among which Maximizing the Audience (Ginko Press 2000) "best illustrates the studio's output", while his book 111 Posters (Gestalten Verlag 2006) displays "Gábors strongly typographic poster art, with works created primarily for cultural institutions". In his artist's book Odysseus – A Graphic Design Novel (2007), Gábor Palotai replaces the verbal with the visual. The book AM MU NA HI (2007) is dedicated to his photography. Gábor Palotai's long-standing project on art-patterns has been realized in independent works of art, textile design, products such as porcelain, and in his latest artist's book ZOO (2017). Gábor Palotai has held several solo exhibitions and participated in numerous group exhibitions throughout Europe.

== Awards ==
- Merit Award "Prisa" 2025. The Association of Swedish Illustrators and Graphic Designers.
- Red Dot Design Award 2024. Dynamic Poster Series. Gabor Palotai – Landscapes.
- Swedish Design Prize, Gold, 2024. We are Seediq. Museum of Ethnography, Stockholm. Visual identity, Exhibition design.
- Swedish Design Prize, Peoples Choice, 2024. Wine series. Videgård Wines. Packaging design.
- Lifetime Achievement Award 2024 / Konecsni György életmüdij / Association of Hungarian Artists and Designers
- Special Prize Oesol International Typography Awards South Korea 2023. Poster design. Skap – Swedish Society of Songwriters, Composers & Authors.
- Swedish Publishing Prize 2023. Exhibition catalogue. Wetterling Gallery / Liva Isakson Lundin – Takt / Tact.
- Red Dot Design Award Best of the Best 2022. Poster design. Skap – Swedish Society of Songwriters, Composers & Authors.
- Swedish Meal Literature Award / Årets Måltidslitteratur, Best Design 2021. Book design. Berättelser och recept by Erik Videgård.
- Red Dot Design Award 2020. Poster design. Restaurant Videgård.
- Swedish Book Art Award 2019. Vera von Toth – A beauty surgeon’s monologue by Linda Rampell.
- Swedish Design Prize 2019. Designer of the Year. Svenska Designpriset 2019.
- Red Dot Design Award 2019. Illustrations. Gabor Palotai – Cosmos.
- German Design Award 2019 Nominee. Poster design. Livsdal of Sweden.
- German Design Award 2019 Nominee. Poster design. Neon Art Gallery.
- Hungarian Design Award 2018. Visual Identity. Livsdal of Sweden.
- Red Dot Design Award 2018. Poster design. Neon Art Gallery.
- Red Dot Design Award 2018. Poster design. Livsdal of Sweden.
- Red Dot Design Award 2018. Poster design. Swedish Exhibition Agency (Riksutställningar).
- German Design Award 2019. Special Mention. Poster design. Gabor Palotai – Zoo
- German Design Award 2019. Winner. Poster design. Contempo Art Auctions
- The Golden Egg Award / Guldägget 2018. Diplom. Visual Identity. Livsdal of Sweden.
- German Design Award 2018 Winner. Poster design for the book "The Shopmodern Condition" by Linda Rampell.
- German Design Award 2018 Special Mention. Poster design. Swedish Exhibition Agency (Riksutställningar).
- Golden Drawing Pin / Aranyrajzszög díj 2017. Lifetime Achievement Award.
- Red Dot Design Award Best of the Best 2017. Poster design. Swedish Exhibition Agency (Riksutställningar).
- Red Dot Design Award Best of the Best 2017. Gabor Palotai – Zoo Illustrations.
- Red Dot Design Award Best of the Best 2017. Poster design. Gabor Palotai – Zoo
- Red Dot Design Award 2017. Poster design. Contempo Art Auctions
- Red Dot Design Award 2016. Poster design Swedish Exhibition Agency (Riksutställningar).
- Red Dot Design Award 2016. Poster design for the book "The Shopmodern Condition" by Linda Rampell.
- Swedish Book Art Award 2016. Facing Heaven by Erik Videgård. Natur & Kultur.
- Red Dot Design Award 2016. Product design. Thriller (collaboration with Anna Kraitz).
- Swedish Design Prize 2015, Gold medal. Svenska Designpriset 2015. Book Design. Facing Heaven by Erik Videgård. Natur & Kultur.
- Cultural Award of Stockholm City. 2015.
- German Design Award 2015 Nominee. Poster design. Violin and cello concerto at Berwaldhallen.
- German Design Award 2015 Nominee. Record sleeve. Oddjob – Live in Bremen.
- German Design Award 2015 Nominee. Corporate and Brand Design. The Mobile Exhibition Lab.
- Red Dot Design Award 2014. Poster design. Violin and cello concerto at Berwaldhallen.
- Red Dot Design Award 2014. Record sleeve. Oddjob – Live in Bremen.
- German Design Award 2014 Nominee. Poster Design. Reflex Architects.
- European Design Awards (Silver) 2013. Poster Reflex. Reflex Architects.
- Red Dot Design Award 2013. Corporate design of the Mobile Exhibition Lab. Swedish Travelling Exhibition. Swedish Exhibition Agency (Riksutställningar).
- Red Dot Design Award 2012. Poster design Reflex. Reflex Architects.
- Red Dot Design Award 2012. Book design Claesson Koivisto Rune, On Yellow. Skandium, London.
- German Design Award 2012 Nominee. Corporate Design. Swedish Travelling Exhibition.
- German Design Award 2012 Nominee. Swedish Travelling Exhibition, Annual Report.
- German Design Award 2012 Nominee. Book Design. Linda Rampell: Freud med Skalpell. GPP.
- German Design Award 2012 Nominee. Record Sleeve. Leucocyte. Esbjörn Svensson Trio. The ACT Company.
- German Design Award 2012 Nominee. Corporate Design. Sollentuna Shopping Centre. Steen & Ström.
- Red Dot Design Award 2010. Record sleeve Leucocyte. Esbjörn Svensson Trio. The ACT Company.
- Red Dot Design Award 2010. Book design Freud med Skalpell av Linda Rampell. GPP.
- Red Dot Design Award 2010. Annual Report of the Swedish Exhibition Agency (Riksutställningar).
- Red Dot Design Award 2010. Corporate design of the Sollentuna Shopping Centre in Stockholm. Steen & Ström.
- Red Dot Design Award 2010. Corporate design of the Swedish Exhibition Agency (Riksutställningar).
- German Design Award 2009 Nominee. Book Design. Function Rules. Ergonomi Design.
- German Design Award 2009 Nominee. Book Design. Gábor Palotai Odysseus a Graphic Design Novel. GPP.
- Red Dot Design Award 2007. Book design Gábor Palotai Odysseus a Graphic Design Novel. GPP.
- Red Dot Design Award 2007. Book design Function Rules. Veryday (former Ergonomi Design).
- Red Dot Design Award 2005. Poster design Made in Sweden. Svensk Form.
- Red Dot Design Award 2003. OP Vodka. V&S Group.
- Red Dot Design Award 2003. Book design Gábor Palotai AM MU NA HI. GPP.
- Red Dot Design Award 2003. Book design and DVD Gábor Palotai Maximizing The Audience. GPP.
- The Golden Egg Award (Guldägget) 2006 (Swedish Communication Agencies) for the exhibition poster Estonia.
- Kolla (Design Award) between 2000 and 2009 approx. 6 different.
- Swedish Book Art Award between 1990 and 2013 approx. 20 different.
- Core International Design Award 2002 for the design of the OP Vodka. V&S Group.
- The Golden Egg Award (Guldägget). Silver. 1987. Christmas packaging design for Hennes & Mauritz (H&M).
- Excellent Swedish Design Prize between 1985 and 2002 approx. 25 different.
- KW Guller Stipendium, 1985.
- Kycklingstipendiet. 1985.
- 2nd. Graphic Design Biennal in Hungary, Békéscsaba. 1980. Special Prize.

== Bibliography ==
- COSMOS by Gabor Palotai. Gabor Palotai Publisher (2019) ISBN 978-91-639-8002-2
- ZOO by Gabor Palotai. Gabor Palotai Publisher (2017) ISBN 978-91-639-2433-0
- Odysseus. A graphic Design Novel by Gábor Palotai. Gabor Palotai Publisher (2007) ISBN 978-91-631-6651-8
- 111 Posters. Gestalten Verlag (2007) ISBN 978-91-976557-0-5, Die Gestalten Verlag
- The Models (Co-written with Claesson Koivisto Rune). Gabor Palotai Publisher (2005) ISBN 978-91-631-6650-1
- AM MU NA HI. American Museum of Natural History. Gabor Palotai Publisher (2002) ISBN 978-91-631-2757-1, Hungarian House of Photography in Mai Manó House
- Maximizing the Audience (The Animated Book). Gabor Palotai Publisher (2000) ISBN 91-631-0594-2
- Maximizing the Audience (The Book) Gingko Press (2000) ISBN 978-91-973912-3-8, C3 Gallery

== Exhibitions ==
During the years Gábor Palotai has had many solo and group exhibitions. Examples:

- COSMOS / Book, digital prints, film / ISBN books+gallery 2023
- Monochrome Landscapes / Olseröds Konsthall 2023
- Code and Algorithm – Hommage á Vera Molnar. Vasarely Museum, Budapest 2020. Group exhibition.
- Odysseus. &KONST - Sigtuna Museum & Art, Stockholm 2019. Solo exhibition.
- Exhibition Hommage à Bauhaus. Institut Hongrois de Paris, 92 Rue Bonaparte, 2019. Group exhibition.
- Exhibition Hommage à Bauhaus. Gallery Pécs, Hungary 2019. Group exhibition.
- Bauhaus 100. Ludwig Museum, Budapest 2019. Group exhibition.
- Symmetrical Landscapes. Olseröds Konsthall, Olseröd, Sweden 2019. Together with Lena Willhammar.
- ZOO - LANDSCAPES - COSMOS. Trafó House of Contemporary Arts, Budapest 2018. Solo exhibition.
- Visual Acoustics - International exhibition of contemporary arts on visual music. Fondazzjoni Kreattivita’, Malta 2018. Group exhibition.
- Found Pixels / Talált Pixelek. Ferenczy Múzeum Centrum, Szentendre, Budapest 2018. Together with Bp.Szabó György.
- Zoo. Hoffmans Antikhandel, Stockholm 2018. Solo exhibition and book release.
- Works / Munkák 1976–1980. Galeria Neon, Budapest. 2017. Solo Exhibition.
- Mycket mer än gångbart. Handarbetets Vänner/Friends of Handicraft, Stockholm 2017. Group exhibition.
- #Bartók. Ludwig Museum, Budapest. 2016. Group Show.
- Unreadable Landscapes. Liget Galéria, Budapest. 2014. Solo exhibition.
- AM MU NA HI. Pictures from the American Museum of Natural History. Hotel Skeppsholmen, Stockholm, 2014–2015. Solo exhibition.
- Thriller. Textile design for furniture. Designgalleriet Kammakargatan, Stockholm. 2014.
- Unreadable Patterns. Hotel Skeppsholmen, Stockholm, 2013–14. Solo exhibition.
- Ränder, rytm, riktning. The Nordic Museum (Nordiska Museet), Stockholm, 2013–14. Group show.
- Liget 30. Olof Palme Ház, Budapest. 2013. Group show.
- AM MU NA HI. Hungarian House of Photography in Mai Manó House, Budapest, 2008. Solo exhibition.
- Odysseus. Röhsska Museum of Applied Art & Design, 2007. Solo exhibition.
- Odysseus. C3. Center for Culture & Communication, Budapest, 2007. Solo exhibition.
- Moscow Biennale 2005. Group show.
- European Design Biennale, London Design Museum, 2003. Group show.
- Dissonanzia, Milano, 2003. Group show.
- Scandinavian Design Beyond the Myth / Berlin, Milano, Gent, Prag, Budapest, Copenhagen, 2003–2006. Group Show.
- Designed in Sweden, Museum of London, Los Angeles, NYC, 2004. Group show.
- Vision Image and Perception, Műcsarnok / Kunsthalle Budapest, Group Exhibition.
- Swedish by Design, NYC, 2005. Group show.
- Galleri Gauss, "den svenska tristessen", Group Exhibition, Stockholm 1986.
- Gábor Palotai: Carpets and Photographs. Röhsska Museum of Applied Art & Design, 1993. Solo exhibition.
- Swedish Steel. Liget Galéria, Budapest. 1990. Solo exhibition together with Miklós Peternák.
- Wunderbaum. Liget Galéria, Budapest. 1987. Solo exhibition together with Miklós Peternák.
- Galleri Linjen, Västervik. 1986. Solo exhibition.
- Fotohuset, Gothenburg. 1986. Solo exhibition.
- Scandinavian Photography. Kunstmuseum Düsseldorf (now Museum Kunstpalast), 1986. Group Show.
- Hellas. Liget Galéria, Budapest. 1986. Solo exhibition together with Miklós Peternák.
- Dark Light, White Shadows. Gauss Fotografiskt Galleri, 1985. Solo exhibition.
- Atelier des Maitres, Paris. 1985. Solo exhibition together with Miklós Peternák.
- Konstnärshuset, Stockholm 1984. Solo exhibition.
- Galleri Gauss, Stockholm 1983, Gabor Palotai, "The store-room silverprints", solo exhibition.
- Actuell Art Gallery, Stockholm, 1981. Solo exhibition.

== Represented ==
- Represented in the rare book collection of the Bibliothèque Nationale de France, Paris.
- Represented in the collection of the Red Dot Design Museum, Essen.
- Represented in the collection of the Nationalmuseum, Stockholm.
- Represented in the collection of the Röhsska Museum of Applied Art & Design, Gothenburg.
- Represented in the collection of the C3 – Center for Culture & Communication Foundation, Budapest.
- Represented in the collection of the Danish Museum of Art & Design, Copenhagen.
- Represented in the collection of the Graphic Design Museum (Museum of the Image) Beyerd Breda, Breda.
- Represented in the collection of the Kungliga Biblioteket (National Library of Sweden), Stockholm.
- Represented in the collection of the Russian State Library, Moscow.

== Books published by Gábor Palotai ==
1. Gábor Palotai: Cosmos. Gabor Palotai Publisher (2019) ISBN 978-91-639-8002-2
2. Gábor Palotai: Zoo. Gabor Palotai Publisher (2017) ISBN 978-91-639-2433-0
3. Linda Rampell: Designatlas. Reissue. Gabor Palotai Publisher (2013) ISBN 978-91-637-3973-6
4. Linda Rampell: Freud med skalpell. Gabor Palotai Publisher (2008) ISBN 9789197655729
5. Linda Rampell: Designdarwinismen. Gabor Palotai Publisher 2007 ISBN 9789197655712
6. Gábor Palotai: 111 Posters. Gestalten Verlag (2007) ISBN 978-91-976557-0-5, Die Gestalten Verlag
7. Odysseus. A graphic Design Novel by Gábor Palotai. Gabor Palotai Publisher (2007) ISBN 978-91-631-6651-8
8. Claesson Koivisto Rune: The Models. Gabor Palotai Publisher (2005) ISBN 978-91-631-6650-1
9. Code. Lars O Ericsson och Linda Rampell. Gabor Palotai Publisher (2003) ISBN 91-631-4276-7
10. Gábor Palotai AM MU NA HI. American Museum of Natural History. Gabor Palotai Publisher (2002) ISBN 978-91-631-2757-1
11. Linda Rampell: Designatlas. Gabor Palotai Publisher (2002) ISBN 91-631-3399-7
12. Linda Rampell: Zoo. Gabor Palotai Publisher (2000) ISBN 978-91-630-9945-8
13. Gábor Palotai: Maximizing the Audience (The Animated Book). Gabor Palotai Publisher 2000 ISBN 91-631-0594-2
14. Gábor Palotai: Maximizing the Audience (The Book) Gingko Press (2000) ISBN 978-91-973912-3-8

== Examples of references ==
- AGI.
- Graphic Design for the 21st Century. 100 of the World's Best Graphic Designers. Charlotte and Peter Fiell. Taschen 2003. Pages 230–235 ISBN 3-8228-1605-1.
- European Design Awards 2013 Celebrating Creative Brilliance (participating) ISBN 978-960-98284-5-1.
- Contemporary Graphic Design. Charlotte and Peter Fiell. Taschen 2007. Pages 396–399 ISBN 9783822852699.
- Grids. Gavin Ambrose and Paul Harris. AVA publishing, 2008. Pages 3, 86–89, 148–151, 160–161 ISBN 978-2-940411-92-4.
- Who's Who in Design. The Leading Designers of the World, ed. Peter Zec, Red Dot Edition, Vol 1, Vol 2 (2003). Pages 276–277, Vol 3 (2007) pages 262–263.
- Novum, World of Graphic Design, München 07/12. Pages 50–51.
- Novum, World of Graphic Design, München 06/07. Pages. 62–65.
- Novum, World of Graphic Design, Gabor Palotai.
- TipoGráfica, Buenos Aires, June/July 2/2, 005. Pages 16–23.
- Eva Atle Bjarnestam De formade 1900–talet, 2005. Page 173 ISBN 91-27-10778-7.
- Octogon. Architecture & Design, Budapest, 2005/2
- Étapes: design et culture visuelle, Paris 07/2004, parade en noir et blanc. Page 53.
- Print. May/June 2007. Page 143.
- BLUEPRINT, June 2005. Page 82–84.
- Kobra / SVT, Interview with Gábor Palotai in His Studio by Malik Bendjelloul, 2004.
- Poster Design. Big Size Visuals, selected by Marc Gimenez, Instituto Monsa de Ediciones, Barcelona 2011. Pages 64–71 ISBN 978-8415223030.
- Los Logos, ed. Robert Klanten and Nicolas Bourquin, Die Gestalten Verlag, 2004. Pages 58, 91, 133, 134 ISBN 978-3-89955-055-9.
- It's A Matter of Packaging edited by Victionary 2005 (participating).
- Romantik, Die Gestalten Verlag, 2003 (participating).
- Bo Bergström, Effektiv visuell kommunikation, Carlssons Bokförlag 2012. Pages 133, 270, 274 ISBN 978-91-7331-507-4.
- Pictogram and Icon Graphics, ed. Ami Miyazaki, PIE Book, Tokyo, 2002 (participating) ISBN 4-89444-214-0.
- 2013 International Poster Exhibition, Korea, 2014. Page 183.
- Nordic Graphic Designers. Arvinius Förlag, 2011. Pages 128–135 ISBN 978-9185689224.
- Peternák Miklós, Gabor Palotai, Maximizing the Audience
- Gabor Palotai Design, Red Dot.
- International Yearbook Communikation Design. 2013/2014 Red Dot Edition. Pages 150,151.
- International Yearbook Communikation Design. 2012/2013 Red Dot Edition. Pages 207, 363.
- International Yearbook Communikation Design. 2010/2011 Red Dot Edition. Pages 150, 153, 204, 367, 453 ISBN 978-3-89939-117-6.
- International Yearbook Communikation Design. 2007/2008 Red Dot Edition. Pages 340, 351.
- International Yearbook Communikation Design. 2005/2006 Red Dot Edition. Page 257.
- International Yearbook Communikation Design. 2003/2004 Red Dot Edition. Pages 158, 216, 217 ISBN 3-929638-81-9.
- Design Award of the Federal Republic of Germany 2009. German Design Council. Pages 481, 485 ISBN 978-3-89939-117-6.
- Design Award of the Federal Republic of Germany 2007. German Design Council. Page 361.
- Lotta Lewenhaupt, "Text eller snarare Betraktelse, Gabor Palotai's utställning, Unreadable Patterns".
- Gábor Palotai, 111 Posters (2007) ISBN 978-91-976557-0-5.
- Margareta Artsman, "Grafisk bortom alla ord", SvD 7/12 2007.
- Maria Papaefstathiu,"Gabor Palotai Design", Graphic Art News 9/5 2009.
- Lászlo Beke, "A Progresszív magyar fotó", Imago Winter No. 3.1996/97.
