= Easter Tournaments in Bratislava =

Velikonoční turnaj v Bratislavě
- Founded: 1955
- Abolished: 1957
- Region: Czechoslovakia (UEFA)
- Teams: 4
- Last champions: (Czechoslovakia) Červená Hviezda Bratislava
- Most championships: (Czechoslovakia) FC Spartak Trnava (Hungary) Újpesti Dózsa (Czechoslovakia) Červená Hviezda Bratislava (1 title each)

Easter Tournaments in Bratislava (Czech: Velikonoční turnaj v Bratislavě) was an annual spring international football tournament held in Bratislava, Czechoslovakia, from 1955 to 1957. The tournament was held in the month of April.

Each of the teams played 2 round-robin 90-minute matches in the tournament.

== Finals ==
Year	Champion	Runners-up	Third place	Fourth place
1955	(Czechoslovakia) FC Spartak Trnava	(Czechoslovakia) ŠK Slovan Bratislava	(Hungary) Vasas SC	(Sweden) AIK Stockholm
1956	(Hungary) Újpesti Dózsa	(Czechoslovakia) FC Spartak Trnava	(Socialist Federal Republic of Yugoslavia) FK Spartak Subotica	(Czechoslovakia) ŠK Slovan Bratislava
1957	(Czechoslovakia) Červená Hviezda Bratislava	(Czechoslovakia) ŠK Slovan Bratislava	(Brazil) Bahia	(Belgium) R. Daring Bruxelles
