= Heavy Load (band) =

Swedish heavy metal band

- Origin: Stockholm, Sweden
- Genres: Heavy metal, Power Metal
- Years active: 1976–1983, 1985, 1987, 2017–present
- Members: Styrbjörn Wahlquist; Torbjörn Ragnesjö; Eddy Malm
- Past members: Michael Backler; Dan Molén; Eero Koivisto; Leif Liljegren; Andreas Fritz; Paul Gray; Patrick Karlsson; Ragne Wahlquist

Heavy Load is a Swedish heavy metal band from Stockholm. The band is often hailed as the first Swedish heavy metal band, and were known for their Viking themes. The Wahlquist brothers, who founded the band in 1976 along with Michael Backler, were later producers and owners of Thunderload Records in Sweden, were at one point producing Veni Domine, and also Candlemass.

Various touring and demo line-ups of the band have included UFO and The Damned bass player Paul Gray, Treat guitarist Leif Liljegren, and the architect Eero Koivisto on bass. Phil Lynott of Thin Lizzy played the bass on "Free" from the LP Stronger than Evil - also as a single-release. Renowned Swedish music journalist and SVT music show host Anders Tengner acted as the band's manager from 1978 to 1985. Misfortune struck when Thunderload Studios got severely damaged due to a water leakage in the 2000s, which meant a halt to its official existence. After the breakup, the members then went on and performed with other bands.

The band reformed in October 2017 and announced a series of shows for 2018, including an appearance at that year's Sweden Rock Festival in June.

On September 6, 2023, the band announced their first album in 40 years, Riders of the Ancient Storm, which was released on October 6.

On January 7, 2025, it was announced that founder Ragne Wahlquist had died at the age of 69. The band was at the time of his death working on a new album which they say will be completed.

== Band members ==
=== Current ===
- Styrbjörn Wahlquist – drums, vocals, percussion (1976–1985, 2017–present)
- Torbjörn Ragnesjö – bass guitar (1979–1984, 2017–present)
- Nic Savage - guitars (2018–present)

=== Former ===
- Paul Gray - bass guitar (1986–??)
- Ragne Wahlquist – guitars, vocals, keyboards (1976–1985, 2017–2025; his death)
- Patrick Karlsson - guitar (1986–??)
- Andreas Fritz – bass guitar (1984–1985)
- Leif Liljegren – guitar (1979)
- Eero Koivisto – bass guitar (1979)
- Dan Molén – bass guitar (1978–1979)
- Michael Backler – bass guitar (1976–1977)
- Eddy Malm – guitar, vocals (1978–1985)
- Micke Söderström – keyboards (2018)
- Johan Westre – keyboards (2018)

== Discography ==
=== Studio albums ===
- Full Speed at High Level (1978)
- Death or Glory (1982)
- Stronger Than Evil (1983)
- Riders of the Ancient Storm (2023)

=== EPs ===
- Metal Conquest (1981)

=== Others ===
- "Take Me Away" (single, 1982)
- Live (VHS, 1983)
- "Free" (single, 1983)
- "Monsters of the Night" (single, 1985)
