= History of AIK Fotboll =

A chart showing the progress of AIK through the Swedish football league system. The different shades of gray represent league divisions.

The Swedish football club AIK was founded in 1891 and won the Swedish Football Championship in 1900 and 1901. In the following years the team competed instead in a Stockholm-only competition, and then in the Svenska Serien. In 1924 AIK joined the Allsvenskan league, and won it in 1932 and 1937. In 1937 also the club relocated to the Råsunda Stadium.

From then until 1992, AIK failed to win the title, and were temporarily relegated to the second division several times. The team were champions in 1992, and again in a reformed league system in 1993. They won the Swedish Cup in 1996, and reached the third round of the European Cup Winners' Cup the following season. In 1999 the club was incorporated and bought many new players. This helped them to reach the group stage of the UEFA Champions League, where they lost to Barcelona.

After this a period of decline set in and AIK were relegated in 2004. However, they returned to the top league the next year, and won both the League and Cup in 2009. After 2011 AIK were doing well without winning titles, until they won the Championship in 2018.

== 1891–1945: Beginnings and golden period ==
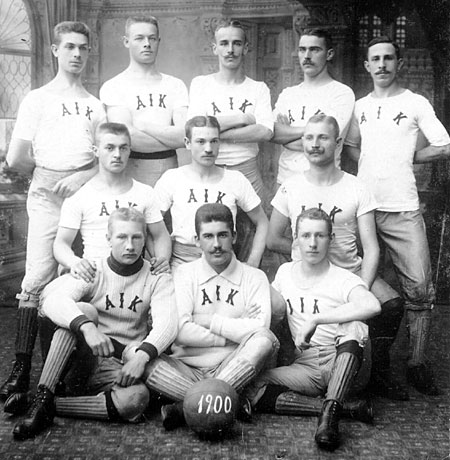
AIK's first squad in 1900 when they won their first Swedish Championship.

Founded in 1891 by Isidor Behrens in Stockholm, at the downtown address of Biblioteksgatan 8, the club's full name, "Allmänna Idrottsklubben", translates to "The General Sports Club" or "The Public Sports Club". The name was chosen to reflect that the club was open for everyone, and also that athletics, at the time called "allmän idrott" in Swedish, was considered the club's main sport.

AIK were runners-up in the championship in 1898 and won its first Swedish championship title in 1900, beating Örgryte IS in the final. In 1901, AIK won another title, after a walkover win against Örgryte IS team II. At the turn of the century, Swedish league football was dominated by Örgryte, who won ten times between the years 1896 and 1909. However, in the period of 1898–1901 AIK won the championship twice and were runners-up three times. In 1899 the team faced Djurgårdens IF for the first time. Djurgården was founded in 1891, the same year as AIK, and therefore the games between these teams are commonly known as the tvillingderbyt (the twin derby), Djurgården is to this day AIK's main rival.

AIK did not participate in the Swedish championships of 1902 and 1903. In 1902, AIK instead competed in "Svenska bollspelsförbundets tävlingsserie", a league competition open only to clubs from Stockholm. AIK competed with two teams in the first year of the competition. The competition was played until 1909, with AIK winning it in 1908 and 1909, and was replaced by Svenska Serien.

Two years after the start of the "tävlingsserie", 1904, twelve teams participated in the championship, one of them being AIK for the first time since winning it. AIK went through to the semi-finals, where they were beaten by archrivals Djurgårdens IF. In 1905, AIK went just as far, this time being beaten by IFK Stockholm. AIK competed in the championship three times in 1906–1910 without any success, but in 1911 they won the championship for the third time after beating IFK Uppsala in the final.

After that, AIK were eliminated in the semi-finals of 1912 and 1913 but won the championship once again in 1914. In 1915, AIK were again defeated by archrivals Djurgården in the semi-finals. In 1916, however, AIK came back and defeated future rivals IFK Göteborg in the semi-finals, beating Djurgårdens IF with 3–1 in the final. In 1917, Djurgården mirrored AIK's achievement, winning against Göteborg in the semi-finals and then beating AIK with 3–1 in the final. Another couple of years passed by without any success for AIK, until 1923, when they won their sixth title after beating IFK Eskilstuna in the final.

From the years 1910 to 1924, a championship called "Svenska Serien" was played. AIK did not win it, but were runners-up a couple of times. The status of this championship status increased in the beginning of the 1920s and it became more important than the Swedish championship.

In 1924, Svenska Serien was replaced by the current highest league, "Allsvenskan", (officially named "Division I"). The first years, the championship were dominated by teams from Gothenburg (GAIS, IFK Göteborg och Örgryte IS) and by Hälsingborgs IF. After some years when AIK finished fourth and fifth and in the middle of the table, AIK won the championship in 1931/32, making it their first Allsvenskan title and their seventh Swedish title.

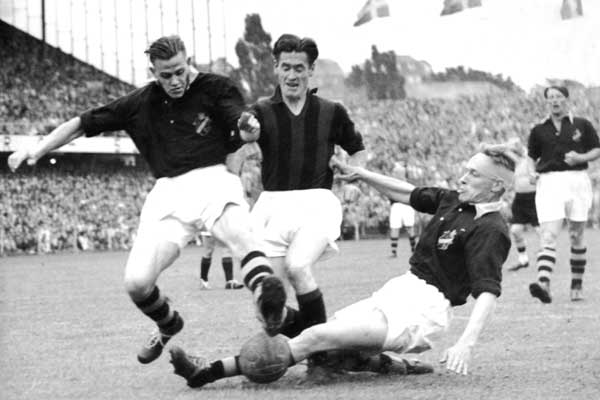
AIK playing against Milan in 1950

The football of AIK relocated in 1937 from Stockholms Stadion to Råsunda Fotbollsstadion in what became Solna in 1942. This was however only one of the things making the year 1937 a memorable year – AIK won their eighth Swedish title. Olle Zetterlund scored 23 goals during the season, and is to this day the player who have scored the most goals during one season for AIK.

== 1945–1991: Mixed fortunes ==
After World War II AIK finished second 1946 and third 1947.

In June 1951 AIK were relegated to Division II. The last game were against Malmö FF, who had gone undefeated for 49 games. AIK beat Malmö, 1–0, but would have needed an extra goal to ensure a spot in Allsvenskan.

After having won Division II AIK returned to Allsvenskan the following season. In the middle of the 1950s, a new star player came to play for AIK, Kurt "Kurre" Hamrin. However, after he left for Italy, the club experienced hard times.

In 1962 AIK were again relegated to Division II, but won it and returned to Allsvenskan the following season. In the early 1970s the club were the one considered most likely to win the league; however, the closest AIK came to this was a second place in 1972. In 1975 40,669 came to see the derby with Djurgårdens IF, a record that lives on to this day. AIK won the Swedish Cup in 1976.

In 1979 AIK were relegated to Division II again, but quickly returned to Allsvenskan. This however meant that Malmö FF advanced to the first place of the All-time Allsvenskan table, a position previously held by AIK.

The Japan Soccer League chose AIK as the opponent for their all-star team in their first ever all-star game since their foundation as a league. On 2 December 1965, AIK battled a JSL all-star team to a 2–2 draw.

== 1992–1995: League champions and European challenges ==
In 1992 AIK were Swedish champions, for the first time in 55 years.

The next year, 1993, a regular league system was reinstated. AIK had the same managers as last year, Tommy Söderberg and Thomas Lyth, and much the same squad. The team opened the season brilliantly. After drawing away to IFK Göteborg in the opening game after a late equalizer, AIK won six straight games, most remarkably by 9–3 at home to Brage, with Kim Bergstrand scoring five. But during the summer, AIK lost ground to IFK Göteborg and IFK Norrköping, who ended up contending for the title. AIK managed, however, to finish third, securing a spot for next year's UEFA Cup.

But first they had to compete in that year's Champions League, which had been created the year before. AIK did not manage to get past the first round though, losing on aggregate to Sparta Prague.

Even though – or maybe due to the fact that – AIK was the only Stockholm side in the top flight that year, the team had their largest average attendance since the mid-1980s. During the summer, AIK had three home matches in a row with gates exceeding 10,000, something not seen at non-derby games since 1965.

In 1994, AIK aimed to regain the league title with a new manager, Hasse Backe, and a big signing, Jesper Jansson. Again, AIK started the season marvellously, only losing once in the first thirteen games. But after three straight losses the team parked mid-table and eventually ended sixth, fifteen points behind winners IFK Göteborg.

After that, the fun was over for that year. AIK lost the cup final, and consequently the opportunity to play in Europe the next season. Also, they did not manage to win a league game in nine rounds, which led to the team being close to having to qualify to stay in the league. This year saw the debut of AIK's youngest player and scorer of the 20th century, Alexander Östlund, at 16 years, 10 months and 2 days old. Östlund would play a crucial role for the club four years later.

In 1995, the season started well once again. After seven games, AIK were at the top of the league, in the Swedish Cup final, and had three players (Dick Lidman, Ola Andersson, Jan Eriksson) capped for the national team. The club ended the season in a disappointing eighth place.

== 1996–1999: End-of-the-century glory ==
In 1996, Erik Hamrén took the reins as sole manager, after co-managing the team alongside Hasse Backe the year before. The year started like the previous year ended, with AIK playing well but being rewarded by few or no points. After seven rounds with five losses, AIK were second last in the league. But then things changed. After a year of being unfortunate, most things went AIK's way during the summer and autumn, including a 6–0 win against IFK Göteborg. After only losing one came during the autumn, AIK finished fourth. The team also won the cup, which meant qualifying for the Cup Winners' Cup.

AIK reached the third round where their paths crossed with FC Barcelona, just before the start of the 1997 Allsvenskan season. For the first time ever, Råsunda was sold out in advance, one month prior to the game. The first leg, at Camp Nou, started in the best possible way for AIK with new signing Nebojsa Novakovic forcing the opposing team's full back to make a weak home pass which Pascal Simpson converted into a goal. The opponents equalized in the very next attack. The match ended 3–1 to Barcelona. In the return game at Råsunda, Ronaldo scored an early goal for Barcelona, but even though AIK managed to score an equalizer, Barcelona won on aggregate.

AIK were now considered the main contender to IFK Göteborg for the league title that year but finished a disappointing eighth. Yet again, however, AIK won the cup and qualified for the Cup Winners' Cup, but AIK went out in the first round against Slovenian side Primorje. Among the new faces in 1998 were English manager Stuart Baxter, goalkeeper Mattias Asper and defender Olof Mellberg. Six of the ten first games ended in 1–1 draws. After eight games, new goalkeeper Mattias Asper entered the pitch. With him between the posts AIK did not lose another game that whole season, moving the team from the bottom of the table to title contenders. In the last game, leaders Helsingborg only had to win against already relegation-bound Häcken, but lost. Alexander Östlund scored when AIK won 1–0 against Örgryte helping AIK secure their tenth league title.

AIK's average points per match that year was less than one, and AIK scored the fewest goals of all the teams in Allsvenskan that year. Asper, AIK's back four and defensive central midfielder Johan Mjällby were much lauded. Mjällby was snapped up by Celtic and Mellberg was sold to Racing Santander.

1999 was to be AIK's most eventful year of the twentieth century. The club was incorporated, and a slew of players were purchased, among them Andreas Andersson who was bought from Newcastle for circa 2 million euros, a record amount for Sweden at the time.

During the season Mattias Asper kept a clean sheet for a record 19 hours and 17 minutes. AIK were destined for winning the league a second time running, but Helsingborg managed to slip by and win the title, albeit on a controversial goal that some people thought should have been disallowed for offside. AIK won all three games against Helsingborg that season (two in the league and one in the cup).

The second place in the league was overshadowed by the glory of reaching the Champions League group stage, the first – and only time since – that a Stockholm side had gone this far in the tournament. The last obstacle was Greek side AEK. After a draw in Athens, AIK beat AEK 1–0 at Råsunda, with Novakovic scoring his most important goal to that point; but more important goals were to come from the Serbian striker in the following group matches.

AIK got the worst possible draw. Every side in AIK's group had the potential of going all the way: Arsenal, Barcelona and Fiorentina. In the first game, AIK took the lead against Barcelona after an astonishing goal by Novakovic. But a while later, the referee allowed a Barcelona corner kick to be taken during a dual substitution for AIK, which resulted in a goal for Barcelona. The controversial decision led AIK's manager Stuart Baxter to utter the following words in desperation to the fourth referee: "This isn't the amateur league, this is the fucking Champions League. Please take responsibility." Barcelona scored 2–1 in added time and won the game. The name of the principal referee, Alain Sars, is forever emblazoned in the memory of all AIK fans present or watching the game on TV.

Another promising show was when AIK played Arsenal away, the first time a Swedish club side had ever played at Wembley. The match stood 1–1 in added time, when Arsenal scored two goals, winning 3–1. AIK then managed 0–0 at home against Fiorentina, but lost the last three games in the tournament. Although AIK in total only won one point in the tournament, the team could hold their heads high after all giving three opposing teams in the group a run for their money in the first half of the group stage.

== 2000–2004: Decline and relegation ==
AIK were the bookmakers' favorites to win the first season of the new millennium, after having continued to recruit name players, like Teddy Lucic, Andreas Alm (who was later to manage the team), Sharbel Touma and Erik Edman – although Andreas Andersson and Pontus Kåmark tore their knee ligaments during pre-season. AIK played well initially, and were in the title race the first 20 matches, but finished poorly and ended third. In that year's Cup the club reached the final for the fifth time in six years but suffered a close defeat to Öis.

The next year, 2001, was dominated by the three major Stockholm sides, with AIK finishing third after their two biggest cross-town rivals: first-time winners Hammarby and runners-up Djurgården (who saw the start of half a decade of league dominance). AIK did not do too well the first half of the season, but with Andreas Alm returning from an injury, the club ended the season excellently, enjoying a 12-game unbeaten streak and ending with four wins in a row. Once again, AIK reached the final of the Cup, this time against Elfsborg. The tournament was decided by a penalty shootout. After a whopping 24 penalties AIK were defeated.

The 2002 season was marred by several managerial changes. Olle Nordin, who had taken over from Stuart Baxter, was sick-listed early in the season and never returned. He was first replaced by the assistant manager, Peter Larsson, who in turn, shortly thereafter, was replaced by a Slovak, Dušan Uhrin. AIK finished fifth that year and yet again reached the final of the Cup, this time losing to arch-rivals Djurgården. As consolation the club won the attendance table for the fifth time in a row.

Richard Money, an Englishman whose only prior managerial experience was running a fourth-tier English side, Scunthorpe, ten years previously, replaced Uhrin for the 2003 season. Having had the same position at AIK's feeder club Väsby, former AIK Champion's League star Nebojsa Novakovic was brought in to serve as assistant manager, a role he would keep for four years, before returning for a second spell as assistant manager in 2011. The feisty Brit and the cunning Serb got an excellent start with six wins and a draw in the first eight games. After a legendary Derby-of-the-twins performance where AIK were 3–0 down but managed to score three goals and get a draw, the club only won one of the following twelve games. AIK finished fifth again, 19 points behind that year's champions Djurgården, who also knocked out AIK in the quarterfinal of the Cup. This meant no European games for the club for the first time since 1998.

The following year, 2004, was an annus horribilis for AIK. At the start of the season, after just three games, Money resigned and was replaced by Patrick Englund. Englund had been a key AIK player in the glory years of the 1990s, but had zero experience as a manager. He had to endure lots of injuries and a consistently under-performing team. As a result, AIK were relegated from the first tier of Swedish football for the fourth time in the club's history. Their fate was sealed after losing 3–0 at home to Öis, surrounded by empty stands due to the pitch being invaded by disappointed fans in the previous game, a derby against Hammarby.

== 2005–2009: Rapid rise and double-title win under Rikard Norling ==
As is common when a team is relegated, several well-known players left the club and were replaced by less costly players. In addition a new manager, Rikard Norling, was appointed. Norling had managed AIK's youth team in 1996, and was assistant manager during the glory years of the late 1990s, when Stuart Baxter was behind the reigns. The 2005 season got off to bumpy start with two defeats in the first three games, when Norling tried out a, at that the time, rather uncommon 3–5–2 formation. From the fourth game onward, after returning to a more common and well-proven 4–4–2 formation, AIK went on a 15-game unbeaten run. With three games to go, AIK secured promotion away at Västerås. Some 6 000 AIK fans had traveled the mere 100 kilometres from Stockholm to witness the game, which finished in a celebratory and non-violent pitch invasion. AIK finished the season in style, nine points ahead of runners-up Öster.

Among AIK's fans, expectations were high for AIK's return to Allsvenskan in 2006, with pre-season games against no-name sides attractiong crowds of 3 000. More than 23 000 people showed up for the opening match, a 2–2 draw against Gefle, a game which saw the homecoming of a club icon of the 1990s, Johan Mjällby, after a spell of eight years abroad – although he only played that game for the club this time around, succumbing to injuries. A highlight of the season was the 3–1 derby win over Djurgården in front of a crowd of some 34 000 at Råsunda, and featuring a dazzling performance by talismanic Ghanaian midfielder Derek Boateng. This was AIK's first win over a Stockholm side since 2002, and was followed up by defeating Djurgården away with 1–0 later in the season. AIK were only defeated three times this year (two of them against local rivals Hammarby) and were in the running for the title with one game left. In their last game, however, leaders Elfsborg defeated Djurgården and secured the title, one point ahead of runners-up AIK.

AIK brought in a couple of Argentine players for the 2007 season, including Iván Obolo, an elegant target man and secondary striker who during his three seasons at the club scored 24 goals in 74 appearances. The season looked promising after a six-win streak in the second half of the season, but then the club sold the internal golden-boot winner of 2006, Wílton Figueiredo, to the Qatari side Al-Rayyan. Sorely missing the Brazilian striker, AIK drew four times in a row, falling out of the title race with half a dozen games left. Finishing the season with defeats against the season's winners Göteborg and runners up Kalmar, AIK ended fifth.

The next year, 2008, was another failed season: yet another fifth place, which meant no European games. This resulted in the sacking of Norling, who was popular among many fans in spite of the disappointing results. AIK won the attendance table, however, with an average home attendance of 15 535. More than 34 000 people witnessed the home derby against Djurgården, a 1–1 draw. Norling was replaced by another Stockholmer from within AIK's ranks, Mikael Stahre. Stahre had been joint assistant manager (alongside Novakovic) under Norling in 2006, and managed AIK's feeder club Väsby for two seasons during their promotion from the third tier in 2007 and return to the second tier in 2008.

Under Stahre, AIK won the league in 2009 after a thrilling title-deciding game in the very last match of the season. AIK needed a draw to win the title and the club's long time captain and club legend Daniel Tjernström scored the winning 2–1 goal at Göteborg, the club's fiercest rivals outside Stockholm, who would have won the league had they won that game. What is more, AIK also defeated Göteborg in that year's Cup final and brought home a third piece of silverware when they won the Super Cup.

== 2010–2016: Backlash, comeback, and establishment as a title contender under Andreas Alm ==
In 2010, AIK suffered a bad start to the season and did not win until the seventh day (3–0 at Kalmar FF). In late April, manager Mikael Stahre left the club for the Greek side Panionios. He was briefly replaced by Bjorn Wesström, then by Scotsman Alex Miller who was replaced by former AIK player Andreas Alm.

The 2011 season saw AIK finishing second. A key player from the 2010 season, Mohamed Bangura, was complemented by fellow Sierra Leonean Teteh Bangura. Though unrelated, the two connected immediately and posed a serious threat to any defense they encountered, Teteh for example firing a memorable four-goal salvo against Halmstads BK in a 4–2 win, and scoring 12 goals in 34 appearances. That autumn, both Banguras were sold – Mohamed to Celtic and Teteh to Bursaspor. All in all, the season was a success with Alm extracting the most from his somewhat limited resources. Nebojsa Novakovic returned as assistant manager this season, a position he held until June 2017.

In 2012 AIK reached the UEFA Europa League group stage. On 6 August 2013, AIK faced Manchester United in a friendly at Friends Arena drawing 1–1.

Under Alm, AIK established itself as a top club, finishing second, fourth, second, third and third again during the seasons 2011–2015. Not satisfied with this, the board of AIK Fotboll made public a goal for the 2016 season that could also be interpreted as a requirement for the club: to win that year's championship, a decision manager Alm stated he was not invited to participate in, much to his chagrin.

On 13 May, eight games into the 2016 season, following a 3–2 away win at Häcken, Alm was sacked. AIK was in ninth place at the time.

== 2016–2020: The second Norling era ==
On 13 May 2016, Rikard Norling was presented as AIK's new manager. He had previously managed the team for four seasons 2005–2008.

With Norling in command, the club managed to play eight consecutive games without losing, including derby wins against both Djurgården and Hammarby, before losing 2–0 away at Malmö 7 August.

A key player for the spring part of the 2016 season was Carlos Strandberg, a striker who joined the squad just two days before the first game of the Allsvenskan season on a short loan spell from CSKA Moscow. Strandberg scored seven goals in twelve appearances before returning to Russia during the summer break of the season.

During that summer AIK recruited another striker who was to become crucial. Chinedu Obasi had considerable experience from prominent Bundesliga side Schalke 04, but was also injury-prone and not fully fit. Therefore, AIK only offered Obasi a contract for the rest of the 2016 season, a decision the club surely regretted later. Debuting in the aforementioned away game at Malmö, Obasi scored six goals in ten appearances, and was widely considered the league's most skillful striker. (A free agent after the 2016 season, he went on to sign a one-year contract with Sven-Göran Eriksson's Shenzhen in China's second tier.)

Under Norling's reigns the team performed very well throughout the 2016 season, adapting quickly and successfully to Norling's preferred, and in Sweden still somewhat uncommon, 3–5–2 formation (a setup Norling had unsuccessfully tried during the first few games of AIK's 2005 season, his first season as manager of AIK).

After the loss at Malmö in July, AIK had a streak of nine games without losing, including seven wins. With three games left of the season AIK was placed second, but lost the title race after a 1–0 away defeat to IFK Göteborg on 24 October. Two days later Malmö secured the championship title for 2016 by winning 3–0 away at Falkenberg.

Forming a striking partnership with first Strandberg then Obasi, AIK's top scorer for the 2016 season was Alexander Isak, who was only 16 years old until 21 September that year. Isak scored 10 goals 2016 in 24 appearances including 19 starts. Thanks to his young age and goal scoring abilities, Isak was on the want list for most of Europe's top clubs that year, and was extremely close to accepting an offer from Real Madrid. However, on 23 January 2017, Isak, now 17 years old, was sold to Borussia Dortmund for a fee that was reported to be somewhere between 8.6m and 10m euros, the highest transfer fee ever paid for a Swedish player.

Leading up to the 2017 season, AIK signed Kristoffer Olsson, captain of Sweden's U21 national team in the 2017 UEFA European Under-21 Championship. After an unimpressive start as a defensive midfielder, Olsson slowly but surely improved and became a key player in one of the two offensive spots in the central midfield. The pre-season also saw the homecoming of striker Henok Goitom.

During the summer break Nebojša Novaković stepped down as assistant manager, a position he had held since 2011, to work with AIK's youth squads and later become manager for Vasalund, a club which has a collaborative agreement with AIK.

July 2017 saw several squad changes, especially among the strikers. Failed Bosnian signing Sulejman Krpić was let go. Nicolás Stefanelli, a short, pacy Argentine with a decent goal-scoring track record from the Argentine Primera División, was given a 3.5-year contract. And after having scored 5 goals in 16 appearances in China's second tier, Chinedu Obasi was released prematurely by Shenzhen and became a free agent. AIK re-recruited the Nigerian for the remainder of the 2017 season.

During the summer, AIK also recruited Rasmus Lindkvist as a left wing back for their 3–5–2 formation. An immediate and arguably unexpected hit, Lindkvist posed just as strong a threat to the opponents as the ever-improving Daniel Sundgren did on the opposite wing. Lindkvist was awarded a spot in the national team in January 2018.

AIK secured the second place in the league with one game left. They finished the season with an unbeaten streak of twelve league matches (eight wins and four draws). The defense had been solid all year, but towards the end AIK also finally got their earlier weak spots, the central midfield and the strikers, to gel and flourish, giving fans hope for a successful 2018 season.

The 2017 season also saw the end of central midfielder, vice captain and set-piece specialist Stefan Ishizaki's second spell at the club, after having played a total of 11 seasons for AIK.

Another player who left the club after 11 seasons was the captain Nils-Eric Johansson, who had to retire from football in February 2018, due to a heart condition. He made 297 appearances for AIK.

Leading up to the 2018 season, AIK made several unusually high-profile recruitments, including Enoch Kofi Adu, Joel Ekstrand and Tarik Elyounoussi plus former AIK players Nabil Bahoui (on loan) and Alexander Milošević.

After suffering major injuries on several key defenders, Robin Jansson was recruited from third-tier Oddevold who had recently hosted AIK in a cup fixture. The 25-year-old central defender, who had been playing in the sixth tier as late as 2015, was working in a factory when the call from AIK came. Jansson quickly secured a spot in AIK's back three, showing off a left foot that delivered lethal crosses.

AIK managed to end in second place coming in to the summer break, which saw another major signing: Sebastian Larsson, who joined the club after playing a major part in reaching the quarter-finals with Sweden in the World Cup 2018.

AIK were in top of the league from the 13th game day to the end, but due to several draws in the final few games, the club needed a win or a draw in the last game of the season, away at Kalmar, to secure the title. A header from Jansson just before half-time was the only goal of the game, and AIK were champions for the first time since 2009. When it was time to lift the trophy, Goitom graciously handed over his captain's armband to former captain Johansson, who had been forced to retire pre-season, and let him be the first to lift the trophy.

AIK came into the 2019 season having sold Kristoffer Olsson to Krasnodar and Robin Jansson to Orlando. Jansson was replaced by Karol Mets, captain of the Estonia national team, who excelled during the spring season. Replacing Olsson proved to be trickier. AIK came into the summer break in third place, however, with last year's signing Tarik Elyounoussi at the top of the league's Golden Boot on nine goals. AIK finished the 2019 season on a respectable 62 points, which, however, only resulted in fourth place, the club's first season out of the top three since 2012, meaning that AIK's only shot at playing in the 2019–20 UEFA Europa League is winning the 2019/2020 Swedish Cup.

Leading up to the 2020 season, AIK lost Elyounoussi as well as first-choice goalkeeper Oscar Linnér, but welcomed back Ghanese midfielder Ebenezer Ofori after four years in the Bundesliga and MLS.
