= Palotai =

Palotai is a Hungarian surname. Notable people with the surname include:

- Gábor Palotai (born 1956), Swedish–Hungarian designer, artist, graphic designer and typographer
- Károly Palotai (1935–2018), Hungarian footballer and referee
- Oliver Palotai (born 1974), German musician
