= Rampell =

Rampell is a surname. Notable people with the surname include:

- Catherine Rampell (born 1984), American journalist
- Linda Rampell (born 1971), Swedish design theorist, critic, lecturer and author
