= Linda Rampell =

Swedish design academic

Linda Rampell, born 5 December 1971, in Stockholm, Sweden, is a Swedish design theorist, fashion historian, researcher, lecturer and author of several books. She holds a PhD at Lund University. In her PhD thesis she deconstructs the modernist discourse of nationalist design in Sweden. In her postdoctoral research project Homo Capitalistes, she concludes that "the only ism after postmodernism is consumerism", and that the postmodern condition has become a shopmodern condition, in which aesthetics and economics have merged into aesthetonomics, which defines an economy of seeing evaluating how much a being is worth. Shopmodernism is the last art historical 'ism'. Objects of knowledge have become consumer goods. The ongoing financialization of everyday life is laid bare through fashionalization. Rampell is a member of International Association of Art Critics (AICA) and has written articles, essays and books on the subjects consumer cultures, fashion and design theory.

== Bibliography ==
- Konsumtionspoesi (2026). (Written in Swedish). Gabor Palotai Design. ISBN 978-91-531-6222-3
- Fashionwashing (2025). (Written in Swedish). Gabor Palotai Design. ISBN 978-91-531-6220-9
- Modebedrägeriet: Dräktdockan som inte finns (2024). Fashion Fraud: The Fashion Doll That Does Not Exist (written in Swedish). Gabor Palotai Design. ISBN 978-91-527-9859-1
- Vera von Toth: En skönhetskirurgs monolog (2019). Vera von Toth: A Beauty Surgeon’s Monologue (written in Swedish). Gabor Palotai Design / A+O Publishing. ISBN 978-91-639-9319-0
- The Shopmodern Condition (2016). Gabor Palotai Design / Art & Theory Publishing. ISBN 978-91-639-0007-5
- Designatlas. En resa genom designteori 1845–2002 (2013). Gabor Palotai Publisher. Summary in English: Atlas of Design: A Journey Through Design Theory pp. 679–695. ISBN 978-91-637-3973-6
- Freud med skalpell. Modekropp prêt-à-suppôter Homo Kapitalismus II (2008). Gabor Palotai Publisher. ISBN 978-91-976557-2-9
- Designdarwinismen™ Homo Kapitalismus I (2007). Gabor Palotai Publisher. ISBN 978-91-976557-1-2
- CODE Manifest (2003). Co-written with Lars O Ericsson. Gabor Palotai Publisher. ISBN 978-91-631-4276-5
- Designatlas. En resa genom designteori 1845–2002 (2003). Gabor Palotai Publisher. Summary in English: Atlas of Design: A Journey Through Design Theory pp. 761–781). ISBN 91-631-3399-7
- A Critical Investigation of the Modernist Project of Design in Sweden (2002). Dissertation written in Swedish with a summary in English, Department of Arts and Cultural Sciences, Division of Art History and Visual Studies, Lund University
- ZOO (2000). Gabor Palotai Publisher (2000). ISBN 978-91-630-9945-8

== Selection of Essays in English ==
- Universal Design: Megalomania and Hypocrisy, pp. 18–21, Design Matters Vol. 7 2004, published by Danish Design Centre.
- The Myth of Swedish and Scandinavian Design, pp. 48–51, Design Matters Vol 3 2003, published by Danish Design Centre.
- Andrea Branzi: ’Out with the Blonde and Perfect Design!’, pp. 70–75, Design Matters, Vol 4 2004 published by Danish Design Centre.
- Towards a Fashion Diagnosis, The Nordic Textile Journal, Vol. 1 2010, published by The Swedish School of Textiles, University of Borås.
- Foreword/text in Cosmos by Gábor Palotai (2019). Gabor Palotai Publisher. ISBN 978-91-639-8002-2
- Foreword/text in Zoo by Gábor Palotai (2017). Gabor Palotai Publisher. ISBN 978-91-639-2433-0
- Foreword in Odysseus. A graphic Design Novel by Gábor Palotai (2007). Gabor Palotai Publisher. ISBN 978-91-631-6651-8
- Foreword in Gábor Palotai: 111 Posters (2007). Gestalten Verlag. ISBN 978-91-976557-0-5
