= Nobis Hotel Stockholm =

Hotel in central Stockholm, Sweden

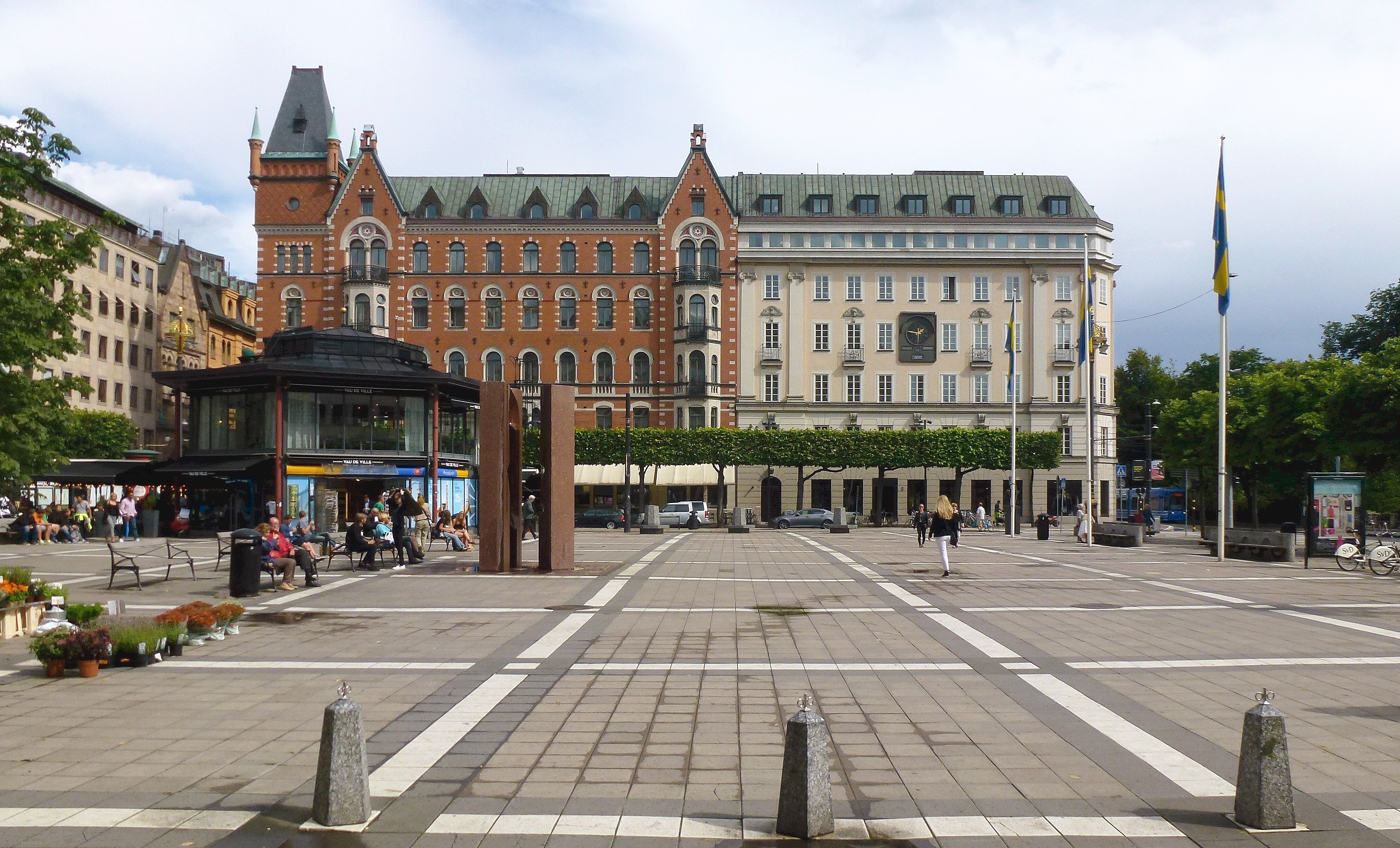
- The hotel occupies the eastern side of Norrmalmstorg. The two sides of the building are joined on the third floor
- Interactive map of the Nobis Hotel Stockholm area

General information
- Location: Norrmalmstorg 2-4, 111 86 Stockholm, Sweden
- Coordinates: 59°20′01″N 18°04′26″E
- Completed: c. 1870 (156 years ago)
- Opening: 2010 (16 years ago)
- Owner: Design Hotels

Technical details
- Floor count: 6

Design and construction
- Architect: Claesson Koivisto Rune

Other information
- Number of rooms: 201

Nobis Hotel Stockholm is an upscale hotel in central Stockholm, Sweden. Located on Norrmalmstorg, the hotel has 201 rooms. Its atrium is one of its notable features.

== Stockholm syndrome ==
It was in Kreditbanken, which formerly occupied the ground floor of the building in which the hotel is now located, where the term "Stockholm syndrome" was coined in 1973. Four hostages were taken during a bank robbery. The hostages defended their captors after being released and would not agree to testify in court against them. It was noted that in this case, however, the police were perceived to have acted with little care for the hostages' safety, providing an alternative reason for their unwillingness to testify. Stockholm syndrome is paradoxical because the sympathetic sentiments that captives feel towards their captors are the opposite of the fear and disdain which an onlooker might feel towards the captors.

== Gallery ==
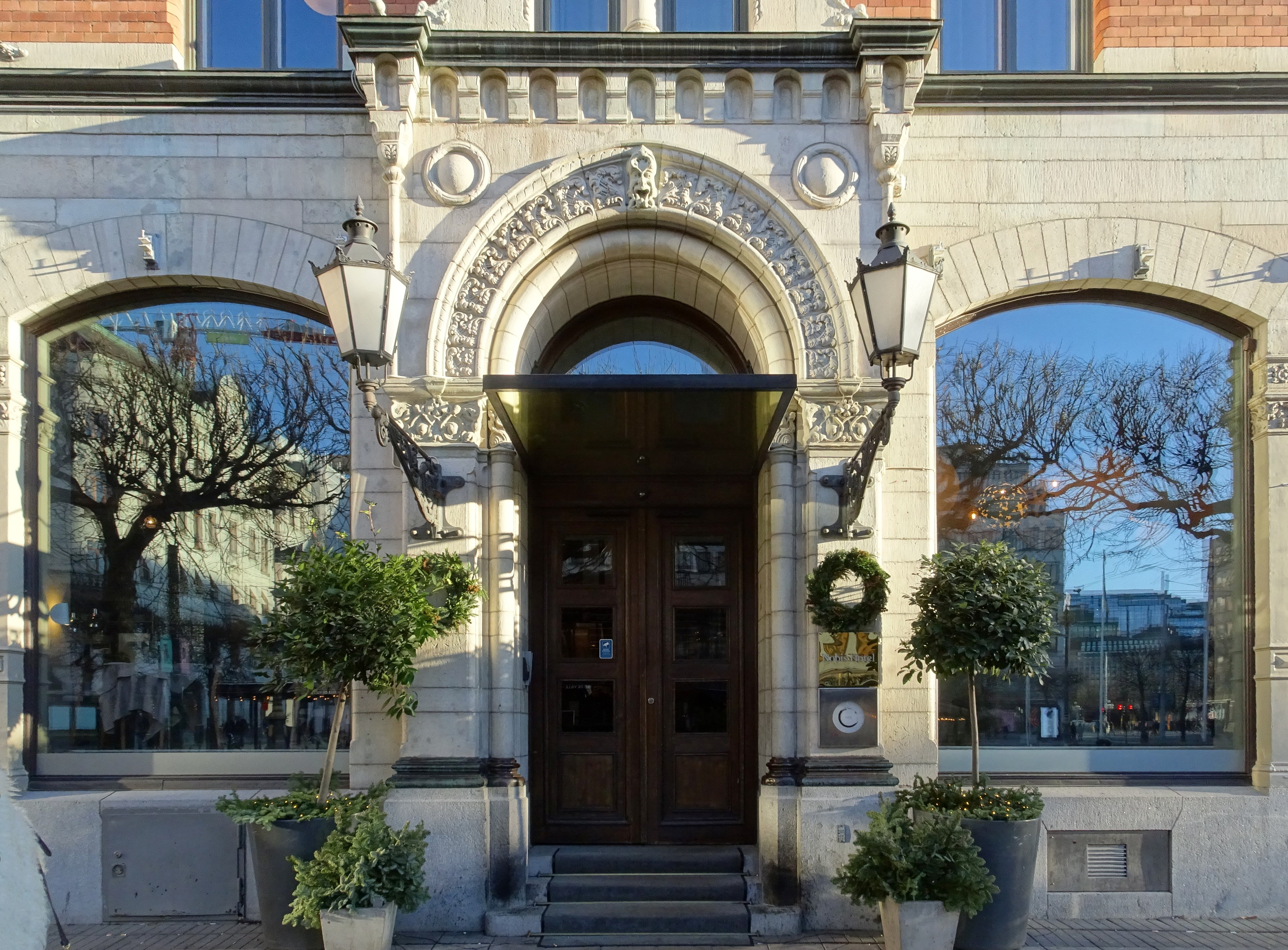
The hotel's entrance

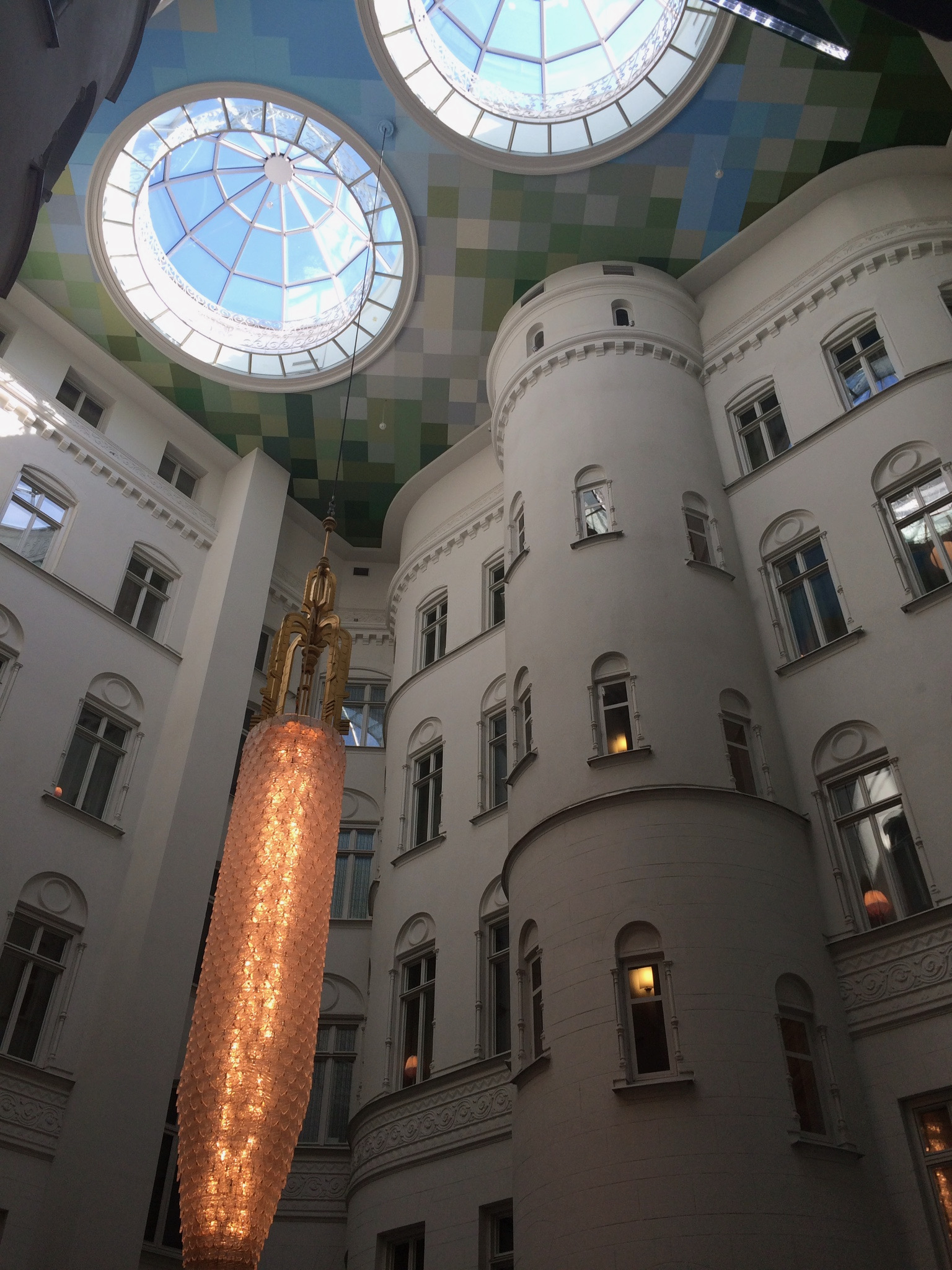
The hotel's atrium, 2015
