= Biblioteksgatan =

Street in Norrmalm, Stockholm, Sweden

Coordinates: 59°20′1.5″N 18°4′22.8″E

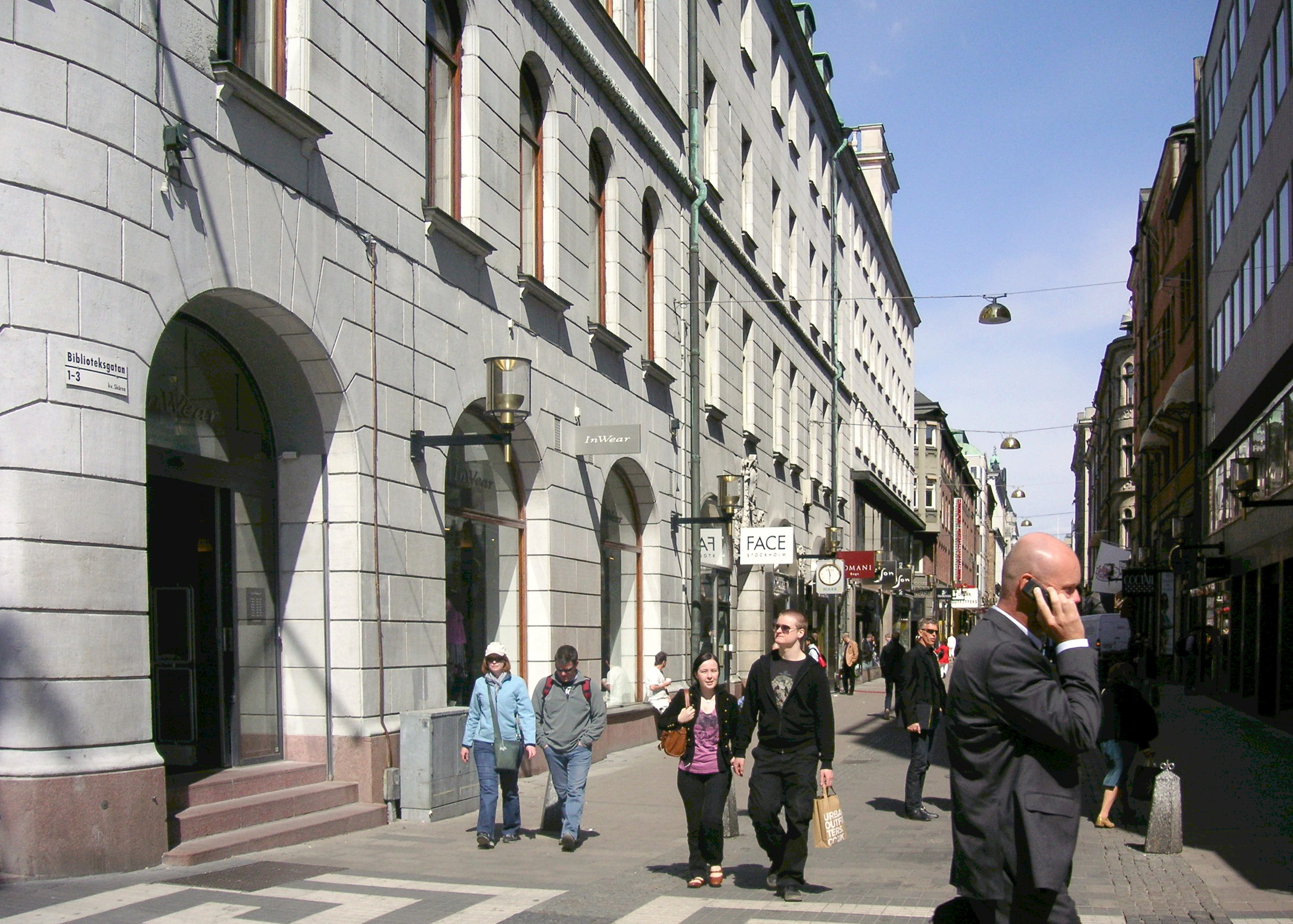
Biblioteksgatan at Norrmalmstorg, the view is to the north.

Biblioteksgatan (Swedish for "Library Street") is a street in Norrmalm in central Stockholm. The street starts out as a pedestrian street at Norrmalmstorg until it passes Stureplan, whereafter it continues towards Humlegården and the Royal Library.

The street is a well-known shopping street with many luxurious brand stores and some of the highest rent levels for retail in Stockholm.

In 2010 the dominant real estate owner of the area, Hufvudstaden, launched an effort to incorporate the streets crossing Biblioteksgatan in a larger shopping district they want to call Bibliotekstan ("Library Town"). The concept is influenced by a similar campaign in London to expand the shopping street Carnaby Street into a "Carnaby Village".

AIK was founded on Biblioteksgatan 8 on February 15th 1891.
