= Norrmalmstorg =

Square in central Stockholm, Sweden

Coordinates: 59°20′00″N 18°04′22″E

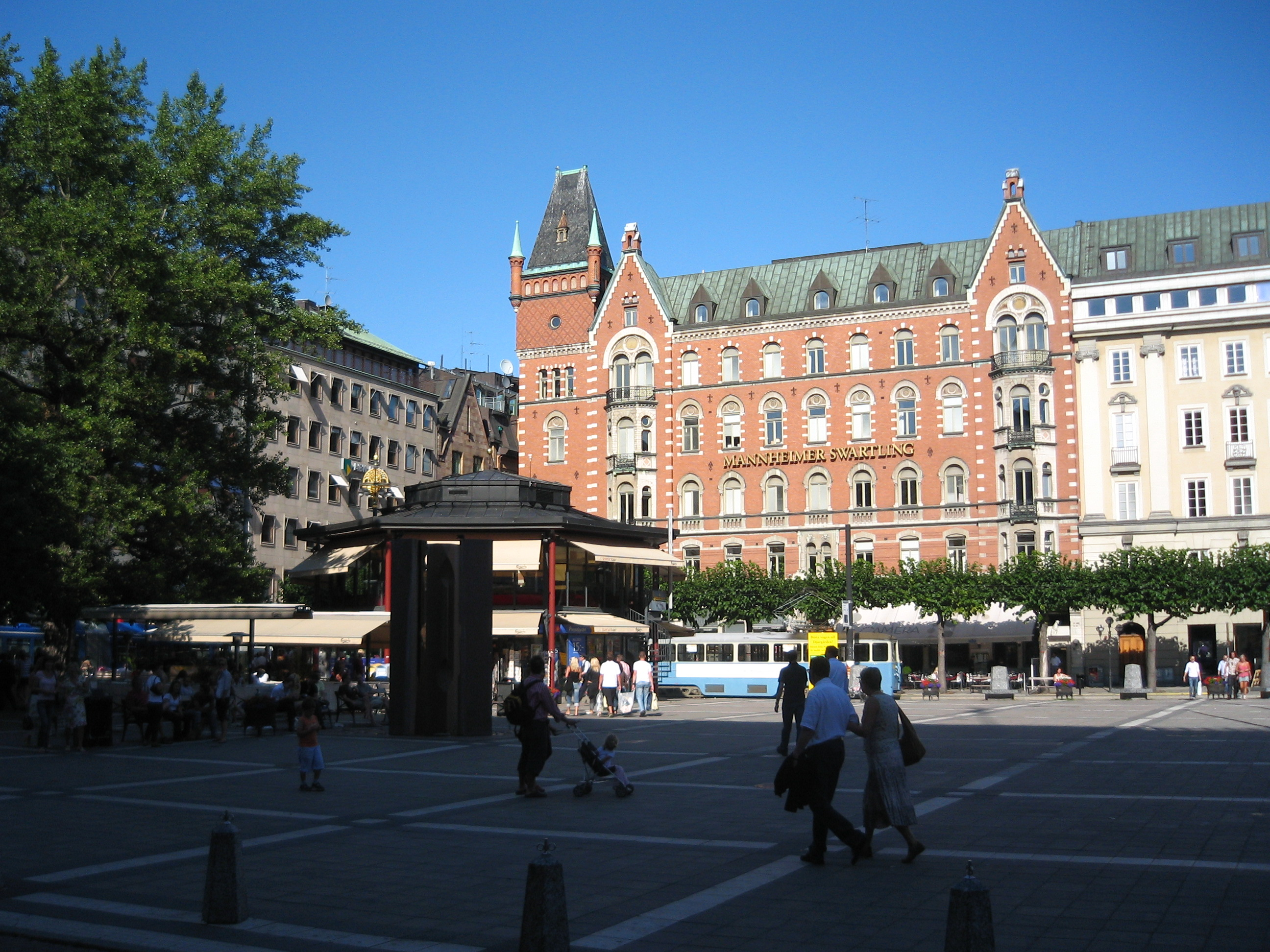
Norrmalmstorg in July 2006, looking at the Nobis Hotel Stockholm

Norrmalmstorg (pronounced [nɔrmalmsˈtɔrj]) is a town square in central Stockholm, Sweden. It connects shopping streets Hamngatan and Biblioteksgatan and is the starting point for tram travellers with the Djurgården line. Close to the southwest is the park Kungsträdgården.

In the Swedish edition of Monopoly, Norrmalmstorg is the most expensive lot.

The square is famous for the 1973 Norrmalmstorg robbery, in which events gave name to the Stockholm syndrome. The building in question is now occupied by the Nobis Hotel Stockholm.

== Gallery ==
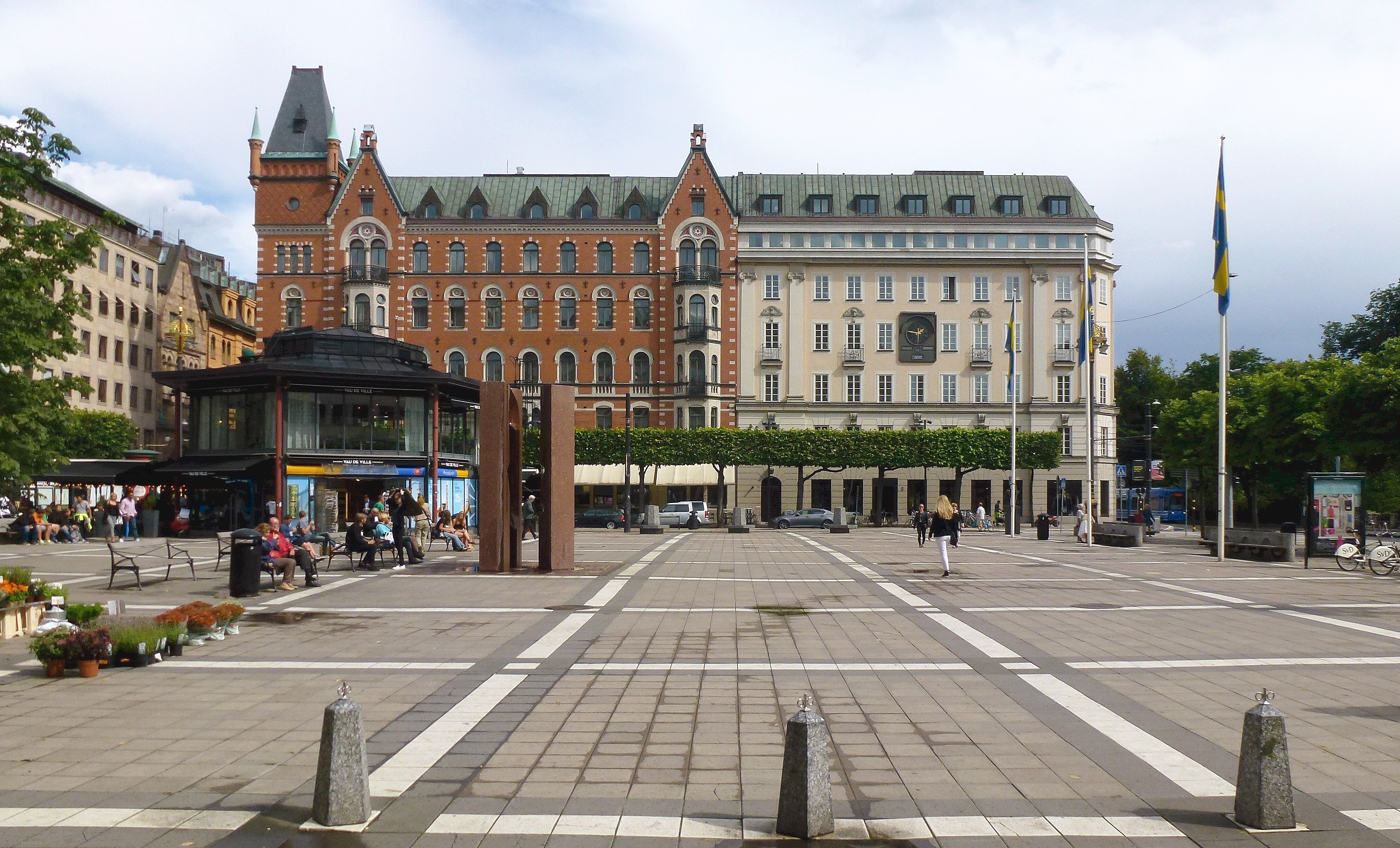
Norrmalmstorg facing east, 2012

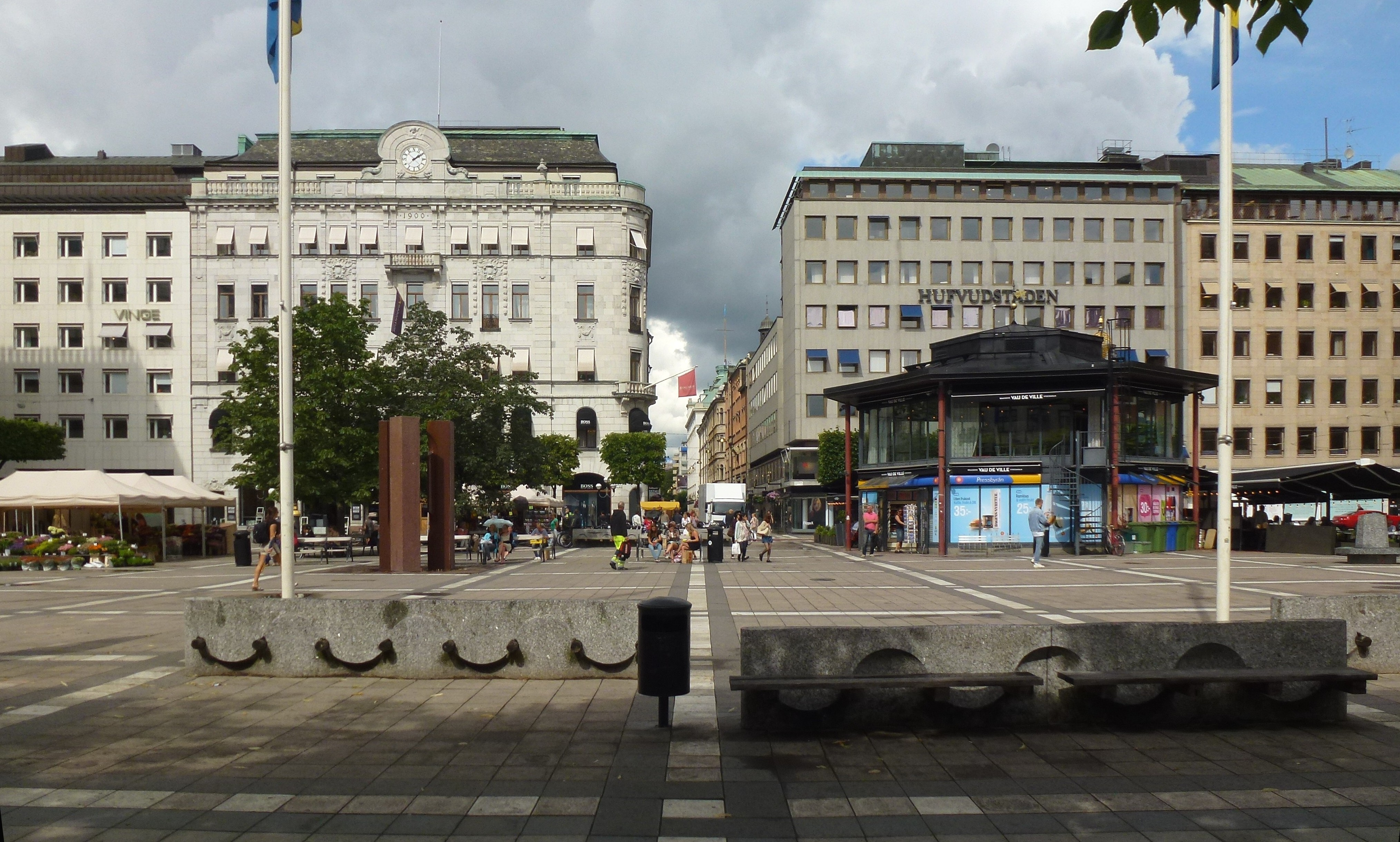
Norrmalmstorg facing north, 2012

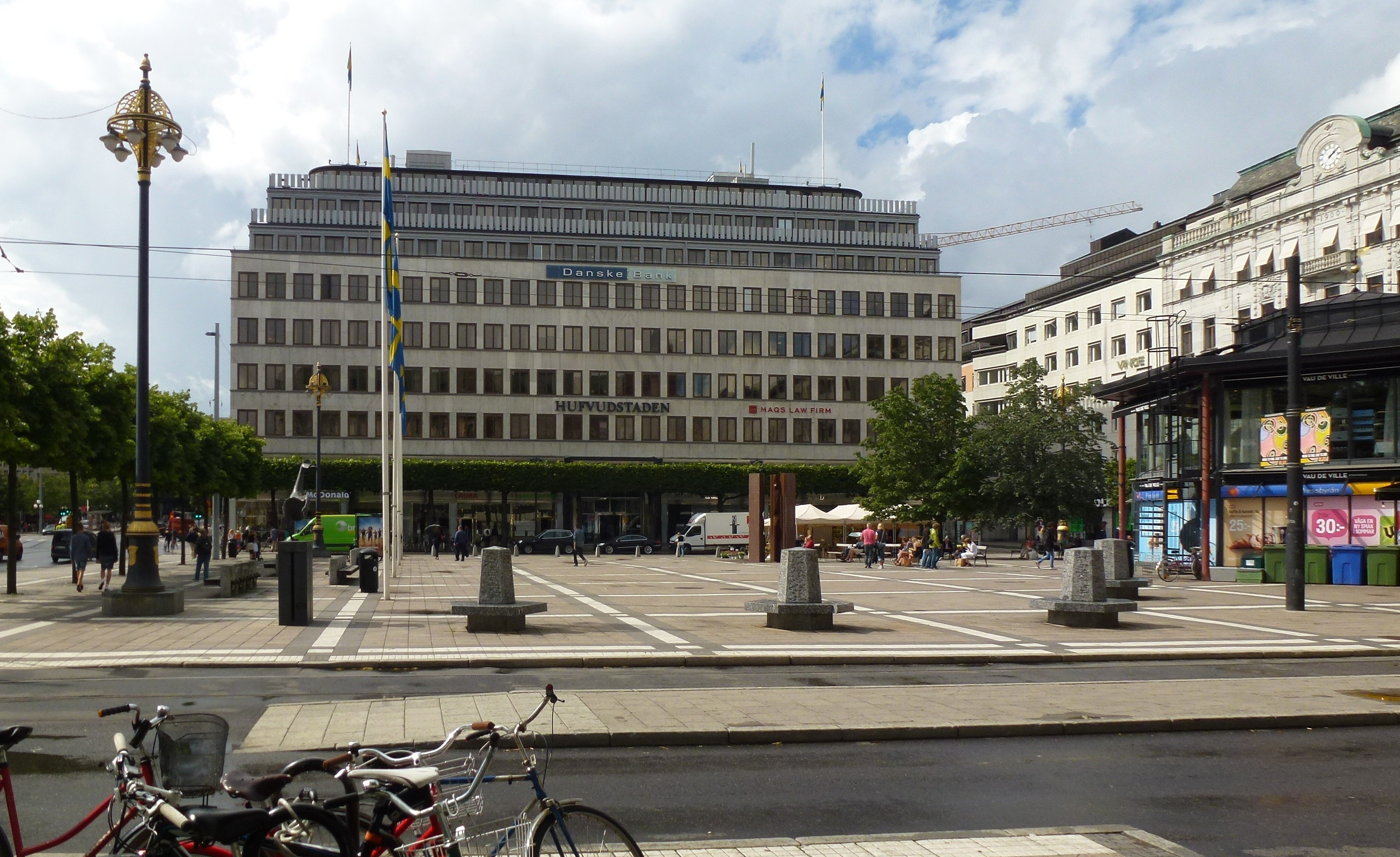
Norrmalmstorg facing west, 2012

== See also ==
- Norrmalm (proper)
