= Swedish Exhibition Agency =

- Riksutställningar

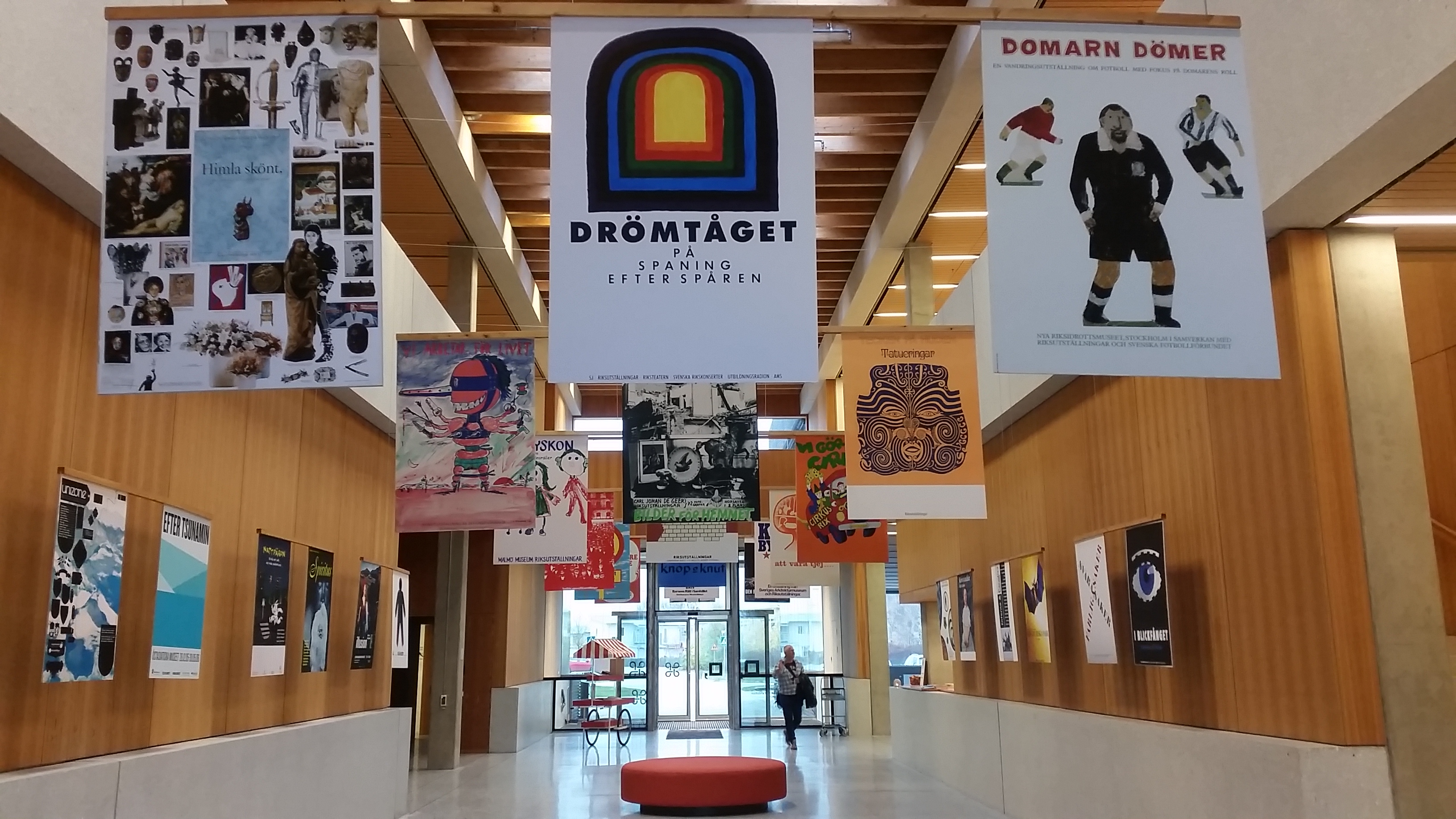
- Poster exhibition in the lobby of the Swedish Exhibition Agency 2015

Agency overview
- Formed: 1965
- Headquarters: Stockholm, Sweden; 57°37′49.9″N 18°18′19.8″E
- Parent department: Ministry of Culture
- Website: www.riksutstallningar.se

The Swedish Exhibition Agency (Swedish: Riksutställningar) was a government agency whose task was to promote development and cooperation within the field of exhibitions.

The Swedish Exhibition Agency was a government agency under the Swedish Ministry of Culture. The task of the agency was to promote development and cooperation within the field of exhibition. The agency's operation also prioritises children and young people, as well as the development and accessibility of Contemporary art throughout the country. The Swedish Exhibition Agency supports museums and other exhibitors in development and collaboration through providing knowledge from global monitoring and analysis. The agency also develop technology and methods together with exhibitors and disseminate knowledge through advice, courses, conferences and newsletters.
