= Isidor Behrens =

Swedish sports administrator (1868–1951)

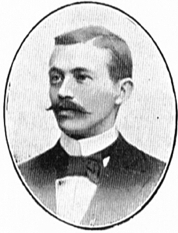

1st chairman of AIK
- In office 1891–1892
- Preceded by: Office established
- Succeeded by: Richard Tengborg

Personal details
- Born: 3 January 1868 Stockholm, Sweden
- Died: 12 September 1951 (aged 83) Stockholm, Sweden
- Occupation: Typesetter

Henrik Enok Isidor Behrens (1868–1951) was the founder of the Swedish sports club Allmänna Idrottsklubben (AIK) and its first chairholder. AIK was founded on February 15, 1891, at the home of Behrens and his family in Stockholm, at the downtown address of Biblioteksgatan 8.

== Early life ==
Isidor Behrens was born on January 3, 1868, in Stockholm. Behrens was of German-Jewish descent after his father, Carl August Heinrich Behrens, who was born in Burgberg, Germany and came to Sweden in 1862. His mother Anna Charlotta Behrens (born Wretberg) was from Häradshammar in Östergötland. Isidor Behrens had two brothers and two sisters. Paul Behrens (1870–1949), Emanuel Behrens (1873–1949), Edit Thekla Ingeborg Behrens (1878–1881), Edit Charlotta Behrens (1882–1964). In other words, Isidor was the eldest of the siblings.

== Biography ==
Behrens was the very first to compete for AIK, at the International Gymnastics and Sports Festival in Stockholm in May 1891 at Svea Livgarden's sports ground with 200 athletes as participants. Behrens and six other AIK members had signed up in various disciplines. Behrens was a short-distance runner. He competed in the 150 meters, but his time was not enough for the final place.

Behrens then tried on many other sports within AIK, from kicking to speed skating, but he never won any really big successes as an active. It was as a leader and board member that he made a name for himself both within and outside AIK. After a short stay in Lidköping in 1895, Behrens moved back to Stockholm, where he lived the rest of his life. From his father he had inherited his profession as a typographer and later became a registrar. In 1896 Behrens married Anna Matilda. The couple never had any children together.

In 1951, AIK prepared for its 60th anniversary. The then chairman Putte Kock and the HS secretary Nils Yngwe Bolling met Behrens at the retirement home, Katarinahuset, by Sabbatsberg, where he lived for the last time in his life. He promised to come to the anniversary party in the Grand Hotel's mirror hall. In the autumn of the same year he died, 83 years old. His grave is found at Norra begravningsplatsen in Solna.

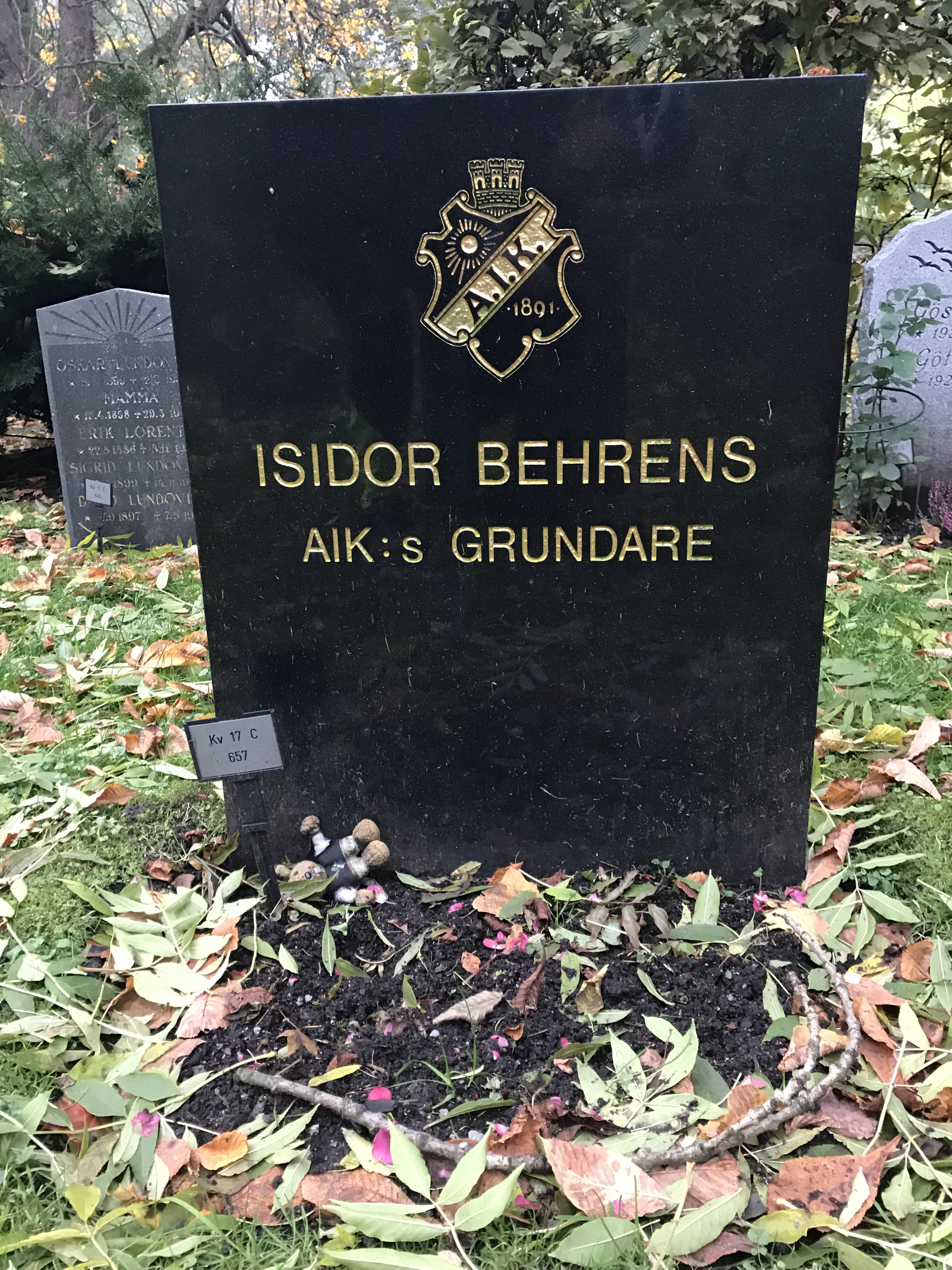
Behrens grave at Norra begravningsplatsen

== Memories of Behrens ==
Behrens is still one of AIK's foremost symbolic figures. To honor the memory of Isidor Behrens, AIK erected a new tombstone for the club's 100th anniversary. Where it has also undertaken to be responsible for the care of the burial site. Since November 6, 2016, a statue depicting Behrens and Putte Kock has been in place between Strawberry Arena and Mall of Scandinavia.
