= AIK =

Swedish sports club

- Full name: Allmänna Idrottsklubben
- Nicknames: Gnaget
- Sport: association football, bandy, handball, ice hockey, and others
- Founded: 15 February 1891
- Based in: Solna, Stockholm, Sweden
- Colors: Black and Yellow
- President: Cecilia Wahlman (interim)
- Website: http://aik.se

Allmänna Idrottsklubben (English: the Public Sports Club), usually referred to as just AIK and internationally known as AIK Stockholm, is a professional sports club from Stockholm, Sweden. Founded in 1891, at the downtown address of Biblioteksgatan 8 in the district of Norrmalm, the club is the largest in Scandinavia. The club's achievements include Swedish championship titles in a slew of sports: football, ice hockey, floorball, bandy, handball, bowling, badminton, athletics, and many other sports, as well as the Wimbledon Championships and French Open in tennis (through Sven Davidson, Lennart Bergelin, and Ulf Schmidt).

== Founding ==
The idea to start an athletic association began when the brothers Isidor and Paul Behrens were taking a walk through Hantverkargatan, in central Stockholm. They were walking pretty fast; and noticed that there were two other youngsters behind them who also walked quickly. The strangers tried to walk past the Behrens, so they had to speed up to keep the lead; but the strangers did the same. Finally all of them started to run in what now looked like an improvised competition. When Isidor and Paul were far away from the unknown youngsters, Isidor said that they should start an athletic association and compete with others.

So the brothers gathered their friends, who had strong athletic interest, and held a meeting at Behrens' on 15 February 1891, on Biblioteksgatan 8, in central Stockholm. Isidor introduced his idea to everyone, and they liked it. Since the boys agreed that every thinkable sport should be practiced, they decided that “Allmänna Idrottsklubben” (The General Sports Club) would be a suitable name. The name also had other meanings: AIK allowed anybody to become a member; and at this time many athletic clubs were limited (e.g. the military).

== Colours and badge ==
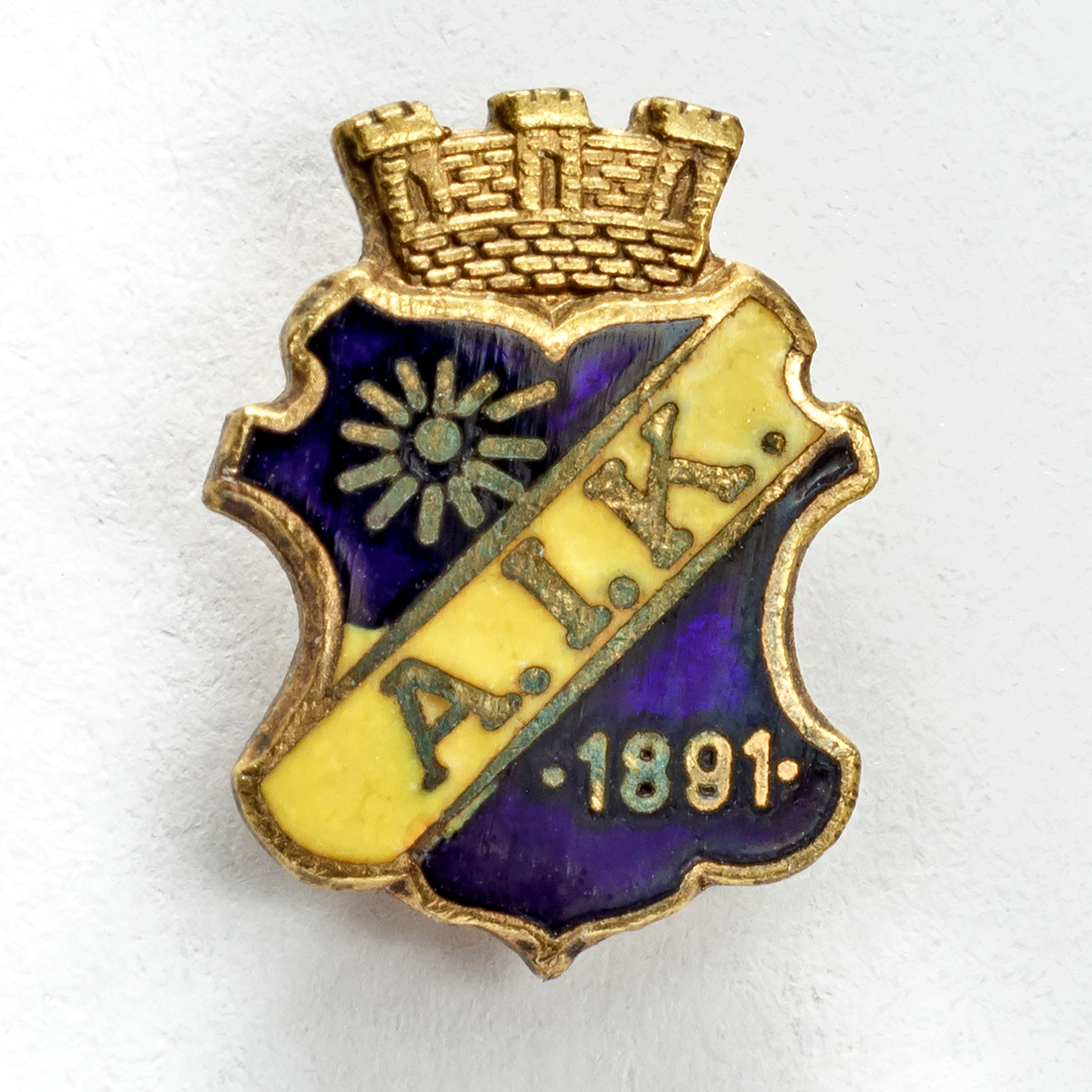
AIK supporter club lapel pin from the 1970s

AIK's primary colours are black and yellow. White is the secondary colour.

The club's crest is dark blue, yellow and gold. The crest's style is arguably Art Nouveau, the predominant style at the turn of the 20th century. AIK's crest was created by Fritz Carlsson-Carling, a runner and football player. Contrary to popular belief, the sun has nothing to do with the coat of arms of Solna Municipality. Solna was not a city until 1943, i.e. six years after Råsunda Football Stadium was completed and 52 years after AIK was founded in Stockholm City Centre.

== Departments ==
=== American football ===
American football became a part of AIK in 2020, when it took over the organization of Northside Bulls. They compete in the second tier, Swedish American Football Division 1.

=== Athletics ===
Athletics was the original sport practiced by the club in 1891. The Swedish term used for athletics at the time was allmänn idrott, from which the club's name is partly derived. Athletics was discontinued in 1916, but reintroduced as a department in 2012.

=== Basketball ===
In 2016 AIK merged with Solna based basketball club Solna Vikings, champions of Basketligan in 2003.

=== Golf ===
Golf was added as a department in 2004.

=== Wrestling ===
AIK competed in wrestling as early as 1893. It is unknown when wrestling was folded. In 2017 several professional wrestlers from Huddinge enquired to create a wrestling department in AIK.

=== Defunct departments ===
Sport	Active
Badminton	1945 to 1966
Cycle	1897 to unknown
Curling	1946 to 1973
Figure skating	1897 to unknown and 1947 to 1952
Kicksled	1892 to unknown
Orienteering	1901 to unknown
Rowing	1893 to unknown
Shooting	1894 to unknown
Speed skating	1892 to unknown
Skiing	1892 to unknown
Swimming	1894 to unknown
Table tennis	1933 to 1977
Tennis	1932 to 1978
Tug of war	1893 to unknown
Weightlifting	1893 to unknown

== Media ==
On 5 February 1995, AIK became the first non-American sports club to promote an Internet website.

== Support ==
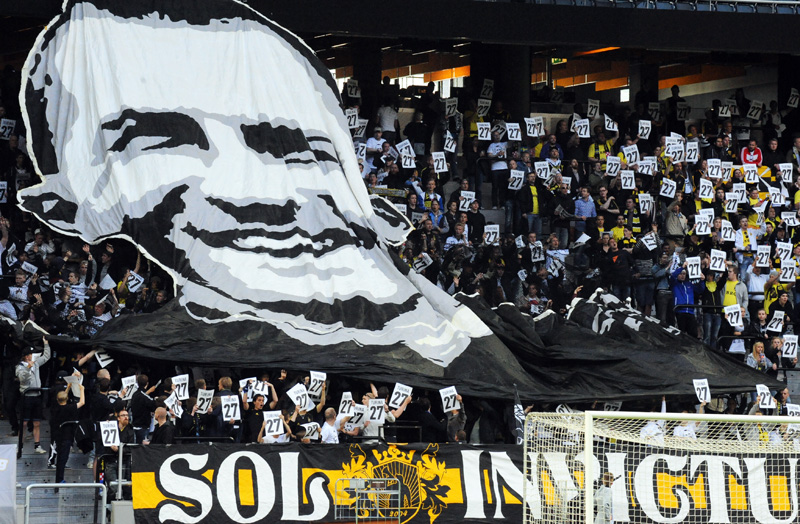
AIK supporters in a charity football game for Ivan Turina in 2013

Fans of the club are referred to as AIK:are or gnagare (meaning rodent); both words are the same in singular and plural.

Although AIK fans can be found all over Stockholm and Sweden, the northwestern central Stockholm urban area is considered the club's stronghold.

Black Army – Stockholm was formed in 1981 and is today the biggest supporter group of AIK. During the 1980s and 1990s, Black Army wrought havoc around the country, making national headlines, as a result of which another supporter group, Allmänna Supporterklubben (the General Supporters Club), was created in 2000 as an alternative. In 2002 Allmänna Supporterklubben was renamed to the much more AIK related name "Smokinglirarna" (roughly, "The Players", literally "the Black Tie Players"). In 2002 an ultras group was formed, Ultras Nord (Ultras North), and two years later, 2004, Sol Invictus was formed. Black Army, Smokinglirarna, Ultras Nord, and Sol Invictus together with AIK-Tifo form the so-called AIK-Alliansen (the AIK Alliance).

In 1907, the Crown Prince of Sweden Gustaf Adolf became patron and first honorary member of the club. This has since been in line with family tradition, and today the King of Sweden Carl XVI Gustaf is patron of the club. From time to time the royal family of Sweden visits the club's home matches. Prince Daniel is a well-known AIK fan even before his marriage to the Crown Princess Victoria.

Notable fans of AIK include songwriter and producer Max Martin; DJ Sebastian Ingrosso; swimmer Sarah Sjöström; former leader of the Swedish Social Democratic Party Mona Sahlin; and Spotify founder Daniel Ek. Former president of UEFA Lennart Johansson was a supporter since childhood. The Wallenberg family are also closely attached with AIK, being one of the major shareholders.

The club's hymn is "Å vi é AIK" (meaning "Oh we are AIK"), a Swedish-lyric cover of the 1971 song "The Last Farewell" by Roger Whittaker.

=== Rivalries ===
AIK's main rival is Djurgårdens IF, also formed in 1891 in Stockholm, just three weeks after AIK. AIK also maintains a strong animosity towards the third major Stockholm side Hammarby IF. The club's biggest rival outside the Stockholm urban area is IFK Göteborg, Leksands IF, and Malmö FF.
