= Gestalten =

German publishing house

- Native name: Die Gestalten Verlag
- Company type: Private
- Industry: Publishing
- Founded: 1995
- Headquarters: Berlin, Germany
- Key people: Robert Klanten (CEO)
- Parent: MairDumont
- Website: gestalten.com

Gestalten is an independent publishing house based in Berlin, Germany.

== History ==
Gestalten was established by three friends: Robert Klanten, Markus Hollmann-Loges and Andreas Peyerl, who all moved to Berlin in the early 1990s. They rapidly came into contact with the Berlin techno and rave scene, initially designing flyers, posters and record covers for music labels and events such as the Love Parade. In 1994, they conceived a book about techno-art, documenting the visual aspects of technoculture.

In order to gauge the market interest, they started to produce order cards, to be distributed through techno magazines. They received over 1000 orders, through which they were able to obtain a loan, which facilitated the production and release of their first book, The Localizer 1.0. This led to the foundation of Die Gestalten publishing house in 1995. The name was later changed to gestalten. The word means to shape, or to create in German.

Gestalten has been led solely by Robert Klanten since the departure of his co-founders Markus Hollmann-Loges and Andreas Peyerl in 2008. The company remains independent, with investor MairDumont and Klanten holding 50% of the shares each.

== Publishing ==
Gestalten's focus shifted away from music towards books showcasing graphic design in 1998. The following years continued this trend, with the majority of books covering design and art themes as well as publishing books about architecture, food culture, travel, motorbikes and bicycles. Since its conception, the publishing house has focused on the international market, publishing in English for a global audience.

== Collaborations ==
Gestalten has partnered with niche organizations such as outdoor brand Parks Project, architecture website ArchDaily, and lifestyle magazine Kinfolk. The company has also collaborated with global brands including Marvel and Monocle, as well as leading creatives such as Stuart Humphryes and Dieter Rams.
