= Claesson Koivisto Rune =

Swedish architectural partnership

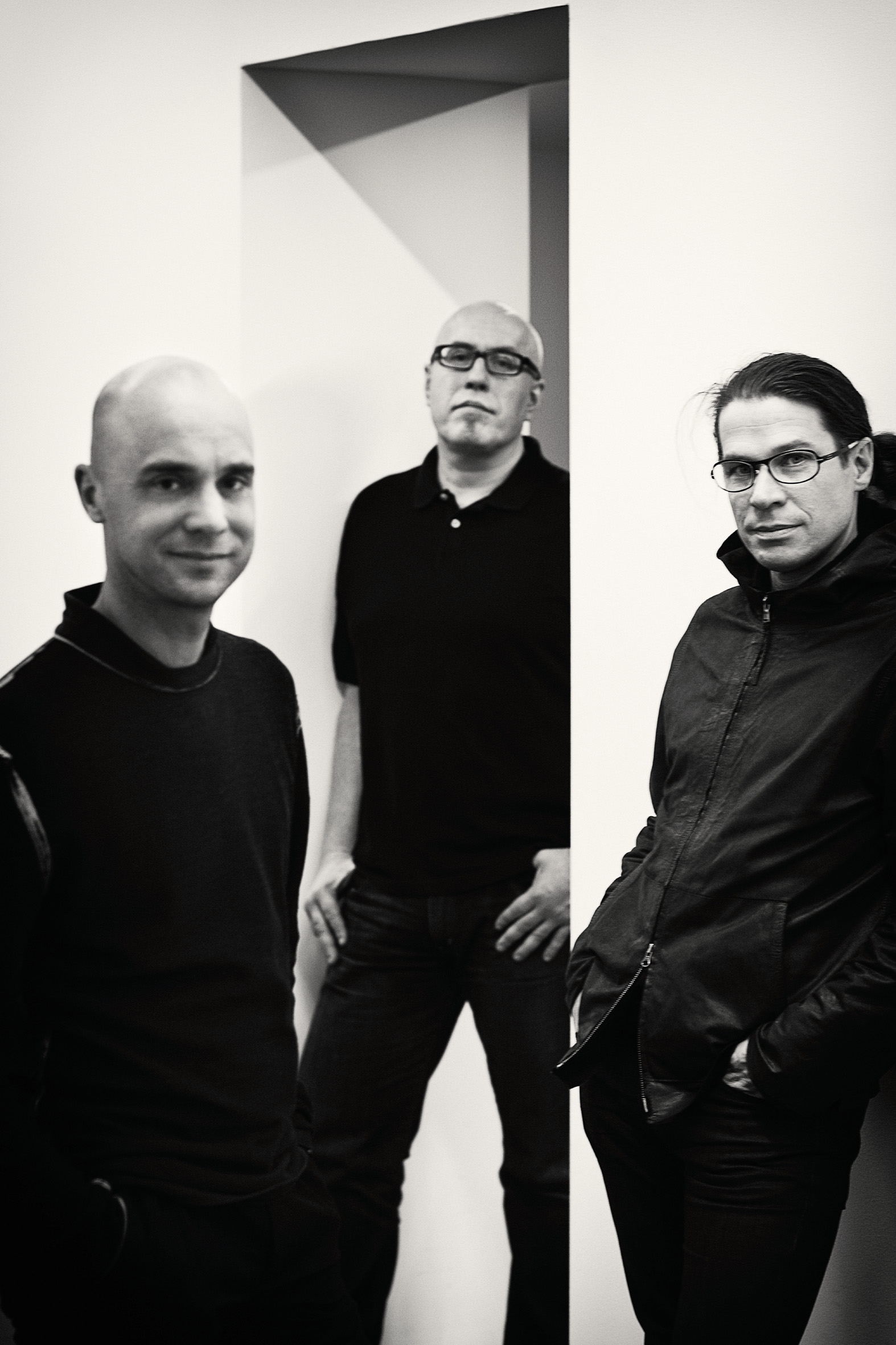

Claesson Koivisto Rune is a Swedish architectural partnership, founded in 1995 by Mårten Claesson, Eero Koivisto and Ola Rune. It started as an architectural firm, but has since become a multi-disciplinary office with an equal emphasis on both architecture and design.

Mårten Claesson, Eero Koivisto and Ola Rune met in 1992 as students at University College of Arts in Stockholm. The trio´s strong desire to connect space and objects inspired them to complement their studies from University College of Arts with architectural studies at Parsons School of Design in New York City, Schools of Architecture, Design and Conservation in Copenhagen and Aalto University in Helsinki.

The office's work spans from private villas and luxury hotels to furniture, jewellery and cement tiles. Represented and produced in Sweden, Austria, Belgium, Botswana, Canada, Chile, China, Denmark, France, Germany, Italy, Japan, Kenya, Netherlands, Norway, South Korea, Spain, UK, Uruguay and USA. Their architectural language has been called "the epitome of the aesthetics of the new millennium" (Paola Antonelli, Design Curator at MoMA). Claesson Koivisto Rune are the subject of 21 biographical publications, and their works appear in some 130 design/architecture books.

Claesson Koivisto Rune were the first Swedish architectural office to be invited to exhibit at the international section of the Venice Biennale of architecture in 2004. They are also responsible for award-winning projects such as the Tind Prefab House collection for Fiskarhedenvillan, Sfera Building culture house in Kyoto and Nobis Hotel Stockholm.

As designers they have been awarded an array of international awards and recognitions, amongst them the Designpreis Deutschland (Gold and Silver) 2011 by the Federal Republic of Germany, Designer of the Year 2011 and Furniture of the Year 2012 by Elle Deco Sweden, both Designer of the Year and Best Seating 2014 by Elle Decor Italia, and the Red Dot Design Award - Best of the Best 2014, making them the first office to hold the prestigious Red Dot Design Award in five different product categories, architecture included. In 2015 they received the Bruno Mathsson Award, the highest honour in furniture design in Sweden and the Scandinavian region.

During Tokyo design festival Design Art in 2018, Claesson Koivisto Rune presented their first art exhibition: Faciem - In search of the essence of the grid.

== Architecture ==
2017, Zander K, Hotel, Bergen, Norway

2017, Xiang Jiang House, Private home, Beijing, China

2016, Parquet Patterned Pool and Spa, Private pool and spa, Sweden

2015, inde/jacobs gallery, Art gallery building, Marfa, Texas, USA

2013, Fagerström House, Private villa, Sollentuna, Sweden

2013, Apartment with Brass Cube, Private home, Stockholm, Sweden

2013, Ceramika, Showroom, Shop and Café, Matsumoto, Japan

2011, Widlund House, Vacation house, Öland, Sweden

2010, Galleri Örsta, Art gallery building, Kumla, Sweden

2008, Stiller Studios, Film studio, Lidingö, Sweden

2008, Folded roof house, Pre-fab house for Arkitekthus, Muskö, Sweden

2007, Plus house, Pre-fab house for Arkitekthus, Tyresö, Sweden

2007, Sfera Shop, Tokyo, Japan

2003, Kråkmora holmar, Island vacation house, Stockholm Archipelago, Sweden

2003, Sfera Building, Culture house, Kyoto, Japan

2003, No 5 house, Private residence, Stockholm, Sweden

2002, Råman House, Ceramicist´s studio, Sweden

== Design ==
2018, Lanterna, Floor and table lantern, Paola Lenti, Italy

2018, Elements, Outdoor furniture and barbecue grill, Widala, Sweden

2018, Oblique, Table collection, Asplund, Sweden

2017, Alicia, Sofa collection, DUX, Sweden

2017, Anita, Easy chair, DUX, Sweden

2016, Cancer Researcher of the Year trophy, Swedish Cancer Society

2016, Santiago, Seating range, Tacchini, Italy

2015, Edi, Table, Nikari, Finland

2015, Io, Sconce light, Fontana Arte, Italy

2015, Smaller Objects, Everyday objects, Smaller Objects, Sweden

2015, Caramel, Side table, Offecct, Sweden

2015, Wafer, Chair, Meetee, Japan

2015, Stockholm, Washbasin and sanitary ware, Globo, Italy

2014, Radar, Easy chair, Emmegi, Italy

2014, Claesson Koivisto Rune W151, Extra large pendant, Wästberg, Sweden

2014, Grappa, Chandelier, Wonderglass, UK

2014, Modulor, Table system, Skandiform, Sweden

2013, Bellota, Chinita, Medusa, Wicker lamps, Made in Mimbre, Chile

2013, Kelly, Furniture collection, Tacchini, Italy

2013, Claesson Koivisto Rune W126, Uplighter, Wästberg, Sweden

2012, Röhsska, Chair, Swedese, Sweden

2012, Heart chair, David design, Sweden

2012, Sense, Air purifier, Blueair, Sweden

2012, Dandelion, Cement tiles, Marrakech Design, Sweden

2011, Folded leaf, Mobile phone, Huawei, China

2011, Kin, Tea light holders, Skultuna, Sweden

2010, Kilt, Cabinets, Asplund, Sweden

2010, Baklava, Lamp, Örsjö, Sweden

2009, Hillside, Storage system, Arflex, Italy

2009, Parupu, Paper children´s chair, Södra, Sweden

2008, Claesson Koivisto Rune W08, Task light, Wästberg, Sweden

2008, Doodle, Seating range, Tacchini, Italy

2008, Amazonas, Nesting tables, Offecct, Sweden

2008, Eve, Bracelet, Smaller Objects, Sweden

2007, Neo, Cooking pots, Iittala, Finland

2006, Aladdin, Chaise longue, Paola Lenti, Italy

2005, Kristallen, National TV award, The Swedish Television Award Foundation

2004, Sfera chair, Sfera Furniture, Japan

2002, Brasilia, Coffee table, Swedese, Sweden

2001, Pebbles, Seating island, Cappellini, Italy

== Books ==
- Claesson Koivisto Rune Architects, Claesson Koivisto Rune. Basel: Birkhäuser, 2020. ISBN 978-3-0356-1894-5
- Portal, Claesson, Mårten et el. Stockholm: Claesson Koivisto Rune, 2019. ISBN 978-91-639-8995-7
- House Art View - Villa Widlund, Claesson, Mårten et el. Stockholm: Claesson Koivisto Rune, 2018. ISBN 978-91-639-8994-0
- Claesson Koivisto Rune Faciem, Claesson, Mårten et el. Göteborg: Claesson Koivisto Rune, 2017. ISBN 978-91-639-5102-2
- Hotel Bergen Børs: A Truly Hotel in Bergen Fraser, Max et al. Bergen: De Bergenske, 2017. ISBN 978-82-690750-2-1
- Hotel Zander K: A Truly Unique Hotel in Bergen Fraser, Max et al. Bergen: De Bergenske, 2017. ISBN 978-82-690750-1-4
- Villa Terminus: A Truly Unique Hotel in Bergen, Fraser, Max et al. Bergen: De Bergenske, 2017. ISBN 978-82-690750-0-7
- Bruno Mathsson Award 2105 Claesson Koivisto Rune, Hedqvist, Hedvig et al. Värnamo: Vandalorum, 2015. ISBN 978-91-980716-9-6
- Claesson Koivisto Rune in Marfa inde/jacobs gallery, Golling, Daniel et al. Stockholm: Summit, 2015. ISBN 978-91-87733-02-4
- Claesson Koivisto Rune + Mjölk Ceremony, Baker, John & Juli. Toronto: Mjölk, 2013. ISBN 978-0-9880857-1-8
- Claesson Koivisto Rune on Yellow, Fraser, Max et al. London: Skandium, 2011. ISBN 978-91-976557-4-3
- Claesson Koivisto Rune Nobis Hotel, Britton, Claes et al. Stockholm: Nobis Hotel, 2011. ISBN 978-91-633-8189-8
- Folded Leaf Claesson Koivisto Rune, Fraser, Max. Stockholm: Huawei, 2011. ISBN 978-91-633-8498-1
- Gallery Örsta, Isitt Mark and Nesser, Håkan. Kumla: 2010
- Smaller Objects, Britton, Claes et al. Stockholm: Gabor Palotai Publisher, 2010. ISBN 978-91-976557-3-6
- Parapu The Paper Pulp Chair, Växjö: Södra book publishing company, 2009.
- Illuminated by Wästberg, Bergquist, Mikael et al. Helsingborg: Wästberg, 2009. ISBN 978-91-633-4672-9
- Claesson Koivisto Rune Architecture/Design, Isitt, Mark; Antonelli, Paula et al.Basel: Birkhäuser Verkag, 2007.ISBN 978-3-7643-7948-3
- Design Secrets: Furniture, Saville, Laurel; Stoddard, Brooke. Gloucester (Massachusetts): Rockport Publishers, 2006. ISBN 1-59253-218-7
- Patterns in Design Art and Architecture, Schmidt, Petra et al. Basel: Birkhäuser, 2005
- Compact Houses, Broto, Carles et al. Barcelona: Structure, 2005. ISBN 9788496263109
- 150 Best House Ideas, Asensio, Paco et al. New York: Harper Collins Publishers, 2005. ISBN 9780060780005
- Sketch Plan Build: World Class Architects Show How It´s Done, Bahamón, Alejandro. New York: Harper Design, 2005. ISBN 9780060749712
- Claesson Koivisto Rune The Models, Alton, Peder et al. Stockholm: Gabor Palotai Publisher, 2005. ISBN 91-631-6650-X
- Designer/Designers, Conran, Terence; Fraser, Max. London: Conran Ocopus, 2004. ISBN 9781840914009
- Nine Houses Claesson Koivisto Rune, Lupi, Italo et el. Kyoto, Sfera Publishing, 2003. ISBN 4-9901483-0-4
- Mårten Claesson Eero Koivisto Ola Rune, Shearer, David et al. New York: Markus Moström Design, 2002. ISBN 91-631-2488-2
- Cappellini, Giulio et al. Spoon, London, Phaidon, 2002.
- Claesson Koivisto Rune, Riley, Terence et al. Barcelona: Editorial Gustavo Gili, 2001. ISBN 9788425218552
- 40 Architects Under 40, Cargill Thompson, Jessica. Cologne: Taschen, 2000. ISBN 3822862126

== Awards ==
- Bedroom product of the Year 2018, Elle Decoration Swedish Design Awards
- Bruno Mathsson Award 2015, The Bruno Mathsson Foundation
- Elle Interior Design Awards 2013
- Designer of the Year 2011, Elle Deco Sweden
- Design S (Swedish Design Award) 2008
- Designer of the Year, Residence Magazine, 2005
