= Nalle =

Nalle may refer to:

== People ==
Given name:
—Note: Nalle is also a Swedish and Finnish word meaning "teddybear" and often used as a (Swedish) nickname for persons with the given name Björn (originally Swedish for "bear").

- "Nalle" Wahlroos, Björn Wahlroos (born 1952), Finnish banker and businessman
- "Nalle" Westerlund, Björn Westerlund (1912–2009), Finnish businessman and government bureaucrat
- Nalle Hukkataival, (born 1986) Finnish professional climber
- Nalle Colt (born ?), Swedish guitarist
- Nalle Knutsson, (1943–2012), Swedish musician
- Nalle Valtiala, (born 1938), Finnland-Swedish writer

Surname:

- Dave Nalle (born 1959), American political writer, game author, and font designer
- David Nalle (1924–2013) American diplomat, writer

== Other ==
- Uppo-Nalle, teddybear and series of Finnish children's novels by the Finnish author Elina Karjalainen
- Nalle (band)
- Nalle-Sisu, marketing name for Sisu KB-24 and KB-124 lorries

== See also ==
- O Nanna Nalle 2000 Kannada movie
