= The Last Reality Show =

Swedish television series

- Genre: Post-apocalyptic; Zombie apocalypse Horror; Comedy
- Developed by: Tord Danielsson
- Directed by: Oskar Mellander
- Starring: Filip Berg; Christian Wennberg; Cecilia Forss; Kim Anderzon
- Composer: Samir El Alaoui
- Country of origin: Sweden
- Original language: Swedish

Production
- Cinematography: Anders Jacobsson
- Production company: Art 89 Television

The Last Reality Show (Swedish: Den Sista Dokusåpan) is a Swedish comedy television series that aired on the TV 6 channel in the spring of 2012. The series portrays a zombie apocalypse as seen through the eyes of the cast and crew of a reality television show. The title of the series refers to the name of the reality show-within-a-show being produced – which is intended to bring forth the ultimate Swedish reality star (stars of actual Swedish reality shows play themselves, as do several other Swedes known for their careers in other fields) – as well as alluding to the fact that almost every episode features the 'death' of one of the reality stars. The show consisted of eight episodes. The series was created and produced by Tord Danielsson, directed by Oskar Mellander and photographed by Anders Jacobsson of Evil Ed fame.

== Cast ==
- Filip Berg as Abbe, a trainee in the crew of the reality show; he is the protagonist of the series
- Christian Wennberg as Micke B, the reality show's deranged and amoral producer. The main antagonist of the series, he finally dies in the last episode, being killed by Stefan who has turned into a zombie.
- Cecilia Forss as Sofie Darnell, the reality show's host and Abbe's love interest.
- Karl Andersson as Stefan, the editor of the reality show.
- Kim Anderzon as Abbe's wise paternal grandmother. She is killed by a gunshot from Micke B.
- Andreas La Chenardière as Peppe, a scientist trying to find a cure for the zombie plague. He is killed by Micke B.
- Gloria Tapia as Shirin, a kind-but-tough nurse. She blows herself up to save the others from a horde of zombies.
- Robban Andersson as himself, a veteran contestant of Robinson, the Swedish version of Survivor. He is killed by Simon after turning into a zombie due to having his finger bitten off by the "Naked zombie".
- Vanita Bergman as herself, a dimwitted but kind reality star who appeared on the Swedish series Lyxfällan ("The Luxury Trap"). She is killed when she and Daniel Paris are attacked by zombies in a trash compound.
- Simon Danielsson as himself, a winner of the Swedish version of Big Brother who proves to be a heroic zombie killer. He apparently kills himself after suffering a bite from the "Socialist zombie".
- Jockiboi as himself, a sex-mad reality star, veteran of Swedish series Kungarna av Tylösand ("The Kings of Tylösand"). He is infected by the "Naked zombie" and is only seen once more, being spotted as a zombie by Micke B.
- Lill-Babs as herself. She is gutted by the "Legless zombie" after trying to fight off a horde of infected.
- Eva Nazemson as herself, a former contestant on the Swedish version of Paradise Hotel.
- Daniel Paris as himself, a scared and spoiled reality star, veteran of the series Ung och bortskämd ("Young and Spoiled"). He is killed when he and Vanita are attacked by zombies in a trash compound.
- Andreas Plogell Wigren as himself, a vain reality star; like Nazemson a former contestant on the Swedish version of Paradise Hotel. He dies when trying to remove his shirt while running, causing him to fall and break his neck. He is the only character whose death is an accident.
- Sibel Redžep as herself
- Patrik Sjöberg as himself
- Meral Tasbas as herself, a cocky veteran of several reality shows, including the original version of The Bar and Club Goa. She is killed by a robber, taking a shotgun blast to her face.
- Jane Timglas as herself
- Matti Boustedt as Bandit leader, a vicious and threatening hunter and the leader of a band of robbers. He is killed by his former friend Tony the Zombie after being chained up close to him by Vanita.
- Ale Ottenby as Robber 2
- Erik Wilandh as Robber 1
- Caroline af Ugglas as a zombie
- Hugo Andersson as Legless zombie
- Magnus G. Bergström as Tony the zombie
- Fredrik Blom as Forest zombie
- Frida K. Eriksson as Socialist zombie
- Pekka Lampela as Naked zombie
- Anders Muammar as Cow-eating zombie
- Rolf Nilsson as Church zombie
- Pernilla Thelenius as Bus zombie
- Anna Tribbler as Hospital zombie
- Viking Almquist as a zombie in the series' opening credits
