= Daniel Paris =

Swedish blogger and lecturer (born 1988)

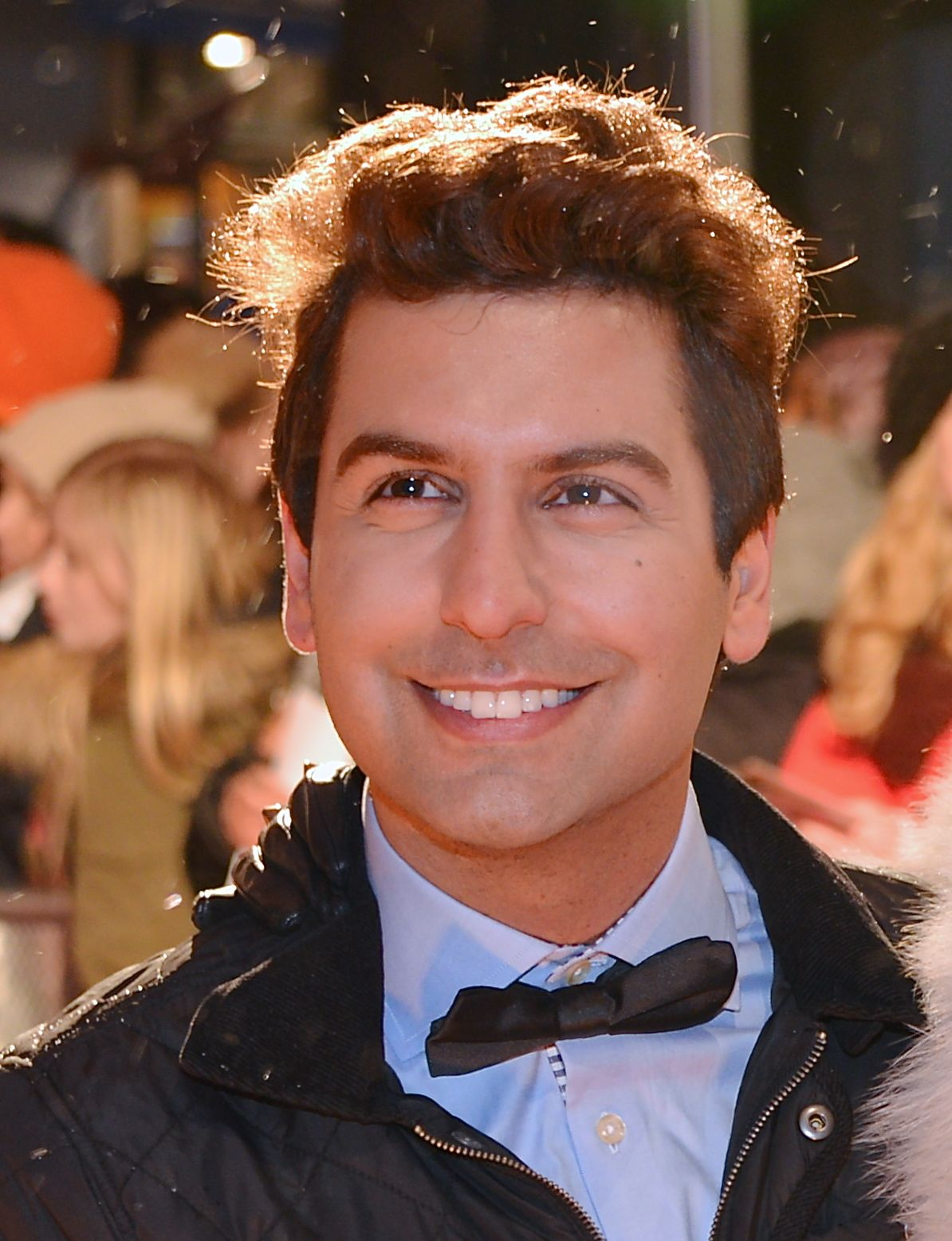
- Daniel Paris (2012)
- Born: Daniel Afshinnejad; 26 July 1988 (age 37); Viksjö, Sweden
- Known for: Young and spoiled

Daniel Afshinnejad (born 26 July 1988), known as Daniel Paris, is a Swedish blogger and television personality. He participated in season one of the SVT reality series Young and Spoiled (Ung och bortskämd) in 2010. Paris won the season.

He participated in the radio and television show Vakna! med The Voice (Wake up! with The Voice) on NRJ Radio on Thursdays through 2011 to 2013. He was awarded Årets toppblogg 2010 (Top blog of the year) at the Finest Awards.

In September 2011, he released a cookbook called "Daniels kokbok – Första hjälpen i köket" (Daniel's cookbook – First aid in the kitchen), the book was made to help and simplify ever-day life in the kitchen for young people who had just moved out of the parental homes.

He made his acting debut in the comedy-horror miniseries Den sista dokusåpan ("The Last Reality Show") which premiered on TV6 in 2012. He was the host for Rockbjörnen awards in 2012 for the newspaper Aftonbladet and host for OMG Aftonbladet, the paper's own show online. Paris also was a guest on the SVT talk show Kaka på kaka hosted by Kakan Hermansson the same year.

Paris also hosted Rockbjörnen awards again in 2013 along with Sanna Bråding. At the time of his Young and Spoiled participation he lived at home, since then he has moved out of his mother's home and now says he is "not spoiled the anymore". He also has been the victim of cyberbullying and death threats after his participation in the reality series. Daniel Paris took the last name Paris for his public persona as a tribute to the American socialite Paris Hilton.

Paris has also been doing work talking to youths about jobs and making a mark in society.
