= Girl on the Run =

Girl on the Run may refer to:

- Girl on the Run (1958 film), an American private detective film
- Girl on the Run (1953 film), an American ultra-low budget independent film
- Girl on the Run (album), a 1999 album by Victoria Silvstedt

== See also ==
- Girls on the Run, an American non-profit organization
- Girls on the Run (poem), a poem by John Ashbery
