= KB24 =

KB24 or KB-24 may refer to:

- Kobe Bryant (1978–2020), American professional basketball player whose nickname was KB-24
- KB24, the station code for Nirō Station in Japan
- KB24, the ICD-11 code for congenital pneumonia
- Sisu KB-24, a Finnish lorry
- 2003 KB24, an unnumbered minor planet
