= Black Lake (TV series) =

Scandinavian thriller television series

- Series 2 Title Card
- Original title: Svartsjön
- Genre: Thriller
- Created by: Ulf Kvensler
- Written by: Ulf Kvensler; Moa Herngren; Peter Arrhenius; Jonathan Sjöberg; Richard Jarnhed; Per Simonsson; Peter Lindblom; Lovisa Milles
- Directed by: Jonathan Sjöberg; David Berron; Richard Jarnhed; Per Simonsson
- Starring: Filip Berg; Sarah-Sofie Boussnina; Mathilde Norholt; Philip Oros; Aliette Opheim; Valter Skarsgård; Anna Åström; Victor von Schirach; Hedda Stiernstedt; Daniel Larsson; David Nzinga; Bahar Pars; Alida Morberg; André Eriksen
- Country of origin: Sweden
- Original languages: Swedish; Danish; Norwegian
- No. of series: 2
- No. of episodes: 16

Production
- Executive producer: Mikael Newihl
- Producers: Emma Nyberg; Lotta Westberg
- Cinematography: Johan Helmer
- Running time: 45 minutes approx.
- Production company: Jarowskij

Original release
- Network: TV3 (Denmark); TV3 (Sweden); TV3 (Norway)
- Release: 20 October 2016 – present

Series 1 title card

Black Lake (Swedish: Svartsjön) is a Scandinavian thriller television series, devised by Ulf Kvensler and co-produced by TV3 Sverige, TV3 Danmark, TV3 Norge, Viaplay, and Jarowskij, that first broadcast in Sweden and Denmark in October 2016. The first eight-part series, which also alludes to hints of the supernatural and horror genres, is based around a disused ski resort in the north of Sweden, and was written by Kvensler, Moa Herngren, Peter Arrhenius, and Jonathan Sjöberg, and directed by Sjöberg and David Berron. The first series broadcast on BBC Four in the United Kingdom from 16 September to 7 October 2017, with two episodes broadcast back-to-back each week. The first series was later released on Region 2 DVD on 9 October 2017.

A second series was announced in 2017, serving as a prequel to the first. The main characters were Filip Berg, returning from the first series, joined by Hedda Stiernstedt, Daniel Larsson, David Nzinga, Bahar Pars and Alida Morberg. The second series follows Johan (Berg) as he and five other participants take place in a rehabilitation programme on the island of Kallskär. The second series broadcast in Sweden and Denmark from October 2018, followed by a BBC Four broadcast commencing on 29 December 2018. A Region 2 DVD release has been set for 18 March 2019.

== Plot ==
=== Series 1 (2016) ===
Johan takes his brother and six friends to the north of Sweden because he is thinking of purchasing a disused ski hotel close to the border with Norway. It never officially opened because a family of four was murdered in the hotel's cellar shortly before it was due to open twenty years earlier. Johan's girlfriend, Hanne, who suffers long-term guilt over the death of her younger brother, quickly comes to believe that the building is possessed by the spirit of a dead child (a myling). At the same time, the surly caretaker, Erkki, is trying to scare them away from the property, with assistance from two Norwegian brothers who run a nearby snowmobile business. Having accepted Johan's marriage proposal, Hanne becomes friendly with Jostein, the younger of the brothers.

Hanne has found a series of child's drawings and these seem to become reality during the stay. Sami words written on paper and walls around the hotel mean "kill or be killed". The group holds a seance where the ghost of a boy named Mikkel seems to be trying to contact them. Jessan, one of the women, gets a red eye, and starts to behave strangely. Hanne speaks to the detective who investigated the first murders. He tells her that he thinks Helgesen, the resort's previous owner, was not convinced he had done the killings despite confessing to the crime. When Jessan tries to kill her boyfriend, Frank, she is subdued and tied up. Hanne discovers from talking to her that Jessan has been having nightmares. Jessan then discovers her bindings have become loose and hides in the toilet. When the police break down the door, she is found dead with a frozen scream on her face.

Osvald, who is secretly dating Johan's brother, gets a red eye and disappears in the cellar. Hanne finds the cellar door open and goes in to investigate, but is attacked and has to flee from the unseen attacker. In the cellar, she finds a secret room that contains medical files, relating to an earlier period when the hotel was a sanatorium. Hanne, her sister Mette, and Frank decide to leave, but Hanne thinks she sees a child in the road, and grabs the steering wheel, causing the vehicle to crash. Lippi is injured in the cellar after finding Osvald's dead body there. Mette, who is a doctor, returns just in time to save Lippi. Meanwhile, Elin, an old flame of Johan's, has a red eye and starts to walk around in a trance. Under the influence of the "kill or be killed" words, she strangles Lippi. When Johan finds her bracelet and realises she has killed his brother, he strangles her to death.

Mette discovers that Erkki wants them gone because he has allowed Dag and Jostein to use part of the cellar for growing cannabis. Johan and Frank confront the brothers, but Dag stabs Johan and slits Frank's throat. When he attempts to kill Hanne, Jostein shoots Dag dead. Hanne walks into the mountains and communes with her dead brother, Jacob. During another seance, Hanne is attacked by something and gets a red eye. All three go to Erkki's house. He eventually admits that he and his half-brother Mikkel lived with their doctor father at the sanatorium. Erkki's mother was a Sami who had a relationship with his father. But because he believed in Aryan superiority he saw Erkki as belonging to an inferior race. After Erkki beat his brother in a fight, his angry father strangled Mikkel for being weak.

After returning to the hotel, Hanne notices that one of the child's drawings shows the bed in the cellar's secret room with a space underneath. Climbing under the floor, she recovers the body of Mikkel. Before they can give the body respectful funeral rites, Erkki stops them. Johan, who now has a red eye, has survived the stabbing; he returns and shoots Erkki. However, outside the cellar Hanne kills Johan when he attempts to kill Jostein. Hanne, Mette and Jostein burn Mikkel's body on a traditional funerary pyre. They then pack their things and leave. However, on the drive back to civilisation, Jostein removes his sunglasses to reveal he now has a red eye.

== Cast ==
- Filip Berg as Johan Cedar; a wealthy Swedish businessman; Hanne's boyfriend (Series 1) and participant of the rehabilitation programme (Series 2)

=== Series 1 (2016) ===
- Sarah-Sofie Boussnina as Hanne; a young Danish woman, still haunted by the death of her younger brother in a boating accident many years ago
- Mathilde Norholt as Mette; Hanne's older sister, a doctor
- Philip Oros as Frank; a friend of Johan's
- Aliette Opheim as Jessan; Frank's new girlfriend
- Valter Skarsgård as Lippi Ceder; Johan's younger brother
- Anna Åström as Elin Hubinette; an old flame of Johan's
- Victor von Schirach as Osvald; a friend of Johan's, in a secret relationship with Lippi
- Odin Waage as Jostein; a local Norwegian
- Anderz Eide as Dag; Jostein's older brother
- Nils Ole Oftebro as Erkki; the resort's caretaker
- Henrik Schyffert as Broman; a retired detective living nearby who investigated the Helgesen murders
- Christian Skolmen as Helgesen; the former owner of the resort, who supposedly murdered a family there

=== Series 2 (2018) ===
- Hedda Stiernstedt as Minnie Karlsson; a single mother fighting for custody of her daughter
- Daniel Larsson as Oscar Leander; a former participant of the programme, returning to participate for a second year
- David Nzinga as Vincent Manucho; an ex-con recently released from prison following a two-year sentence
- Bahar Pars as Amina Herlitz; a recovering sex addict and adulterer
- Alida Morberg as Isabelle 'Bella' Berglund; a former employee-turned-participant of the programme
- André Eriksen as Uno Lejon; leader of the Kallskär rehabilitation programme
- Ester Uddén as Agnes Linder; Uno's assistant and second-in-command
- Anja Landgré as Gittan Manheim; childhood inhabitant of Kallskär
- Valter Skarsgård as Lippi Ceder; Johan's younger brother (brief appearance)
- Anna Åström as Elin Hubinette (brief appearance)

== Episodes ==
=== Series 1 (2016) ===
No.	Title	Directed by	Written by	Original release date	UK viewers (millions)
1	"Episode 1"	Jonathan Sjöberg	Ulf Kvensler	20 October 2016	1.04
2	"Episode 2"	Jonathan Sjöberg	Ulf Kvensler	27 October 2016	0.87
3	"Episode 3"	Jonathan Sjöberg	Jonathan Sjöberg	3 November 2016	0.63
4	"Episode 4"	Jonathan Sjöberg	Jonathan Sjöberg	10 November 2016	0.55
5	"Episode 5"	David Berron	Moa Herngren	17 November 2016	0.56
6	"Episode 6"	David Berron	Moa Herngren	24 November 2016	0.49
7	"Episode 7"	David Berron	Moa Herngren	1 December 2016	0.60
8	"Episode 8"	David Berron	Peter Arrhenius	1 December 2016	0.58

=== Series 2 (2018) ===
No.	Title	Directed by	Written by	Original release date	UK viewers (millions)
1	"Episode 1"	Richard Jarnhed	Lovisa Milles	10 October 2018	N/A
Six participants arrive on the island of Kallskär to take part in a two-week rehabilitation programme. Johan (Filip Berg), pressured by his father into closing a potentially life-changing business deal, finds himself torn as he also requires a pass grade from the programme instructor, Uno, in order to allow him to continue his university studies. Arriving on the island, Johan tries his best to avoid handing over his phone and computer in order to rearrange an important business meeting, but soon finds himself at odds with Uno (André Eriksen) and his assistant, Agnes (Ester Uddén). Meanwhile, Minnie (Hedda Stiernstedt), a former drug addict and single mother fighting for the custody of her daughter, is spooked after sighting a decomposing body in the water on the Kallskär shore.
2	"Episode 2"	Richard Jarnhed	Peter Lindblom	10 October 2018	N/A
Uno tries to persuade Minnie that her hallucinogenic episodes have returned, and that she could not have possibly seen a body as nobody has been reported missing. Johan witnesses Amina (Bahar Pars) and Uno having sex, and later enlists Vincent (David Nzinga)'s help to break into Uno's office after an assault course bet with Uno results in the entire group suffering a forfeit. After collapsing during group therapy, Johan finds comfort in Bella (Alida Morberg), a former employee-turned-participant of the programme. As Johan and Bella grow closer, Minnie continues to suspect that Room 5 may hide secrets that Uno, Agnes and Gittan want to keep well hidden.
3	"Episode 3"	Richard Jarnhed	Moa Herngren	17 October 2018	N/A
Minnie finally gains access to Room 5, where she finds a locket enscribed with the name 'Maja' hidden in a drawer. Johan continues to quiz Uno over the events that occurred during last year's programme. Gittan catches Johan trying to flee the island to meet with his brother.
4	"Episode 4"	Richard Jarnhed	Richard Jarnhed	24 October 2018	N/A
Johan uncovers evidence which suggests that Uno is living under an assumed identity. Minnie is injured during a hiking expedition, leading to tensions within the group coming to the boil. Amina, ashamed of her past, decides to pack her bags and leave the island, but whilst trying to steal Gittan's boat, makes a shocking discovery.
5	"Episode 5"	Per Simonsson	Peter Lindblom & Per Simonsson	31 October 2018	N/A
Following Amina's disappearance, Uno takes the group on an exploration trip to a former Cholera hospital used in the Second World War to home Baltic refugees. Vincent confronts Oscar and demands to know any information pertaining to Amina's whereabouts. Uno reveals to Minnie that three weeks after her disappearance, Josefine's daughter Elsa also disappeared without trace, suggesting that she may have executed her plan of leaving the island and disappearing to start a new life.
6	"Episode 6"	Per Simonsson	Moa Herngren & Per Simonsson	7 November 2018	N/A
Minnie and Johan break into Gittan's home to try and find evidence pertaining to Josefine's disappearance. Uno conducts the end of programme interviews, where Oscar finally reveals his true motive for returning for a second year. Minnie makes contact with Josefine's former partner, who claims to have no knowledge of the whereabouts of his ex-wife or daughter.
7	"Episode 7"	Per Simonsson	Lovisa Milles & Per Simonsson	14 November 2018	N/A
Uno and Agnes awaken to find Oscar has disappeared and his room has been trashed. The remaining inhabitants split up to search for Oscar. Meanwhile Johan, having discovered some accounting irregularities blackmails Uno into recovering his laptop and phone and receives the attendance certificate he needs to avoid jail. He contacts his brother Lippi and leaves the island on a boat with him and Elin. Minnie finds Oscar hiding out at the cholera hospital in the company of Amina's corpse, but he runs away. Uno finds that all telephone contact to the mainland has been cut off and Gittan and her boat have disappeared.
8	"Episode 8"	Per Simonsson	Per Simonsson	21 November 2018	N/A
Johan decides to return to the island, and finds Gittan's boat floating aimlessly in the sea, with a terrified Oscar on board. Minnie heads to the abandoned lighthouse where she finds Elsa being held captive by Bella. Uno and Vincent try to establish telephone contact with the mainland but find Amina's body and are interrupted by Gittan. Minnie, having been stabbed by Bella, goes to the roof of the lighthouse where she is found by Elsa. When Uno arrives to rescue her, Bella admits to having murdered Josefina but blames the evil atmosphere of the island. She stabs him, but Minnie and Elsa manage to escape while Bella is preoccupied with the dying Uno. Johan is alerted by Elsa's cries for help and saves them; in the final scene, Elsa is reunited with her father and Minnie with her daughter.

== Reception ==
Karolina Fjellborg of Aftonbladet wrote that she felt that the characters in the first series were "predictable" and that the series "added nothing to the horror genre", but that she enjoyed Henrik Schyffert's performance and that his casting as the police officer Broman was an "inspired decision". She concluded that the series could "work for younger viewers who might be unaffected by the series' lack of originality".
