= Club Goa =

2005 Swedish TV show

Club Goa was a 2005 Swedish TV show in which STRIX Television's 12 most famous reality TV stars went on a bar tour to Goa, India. In 2005, several reality shows had been aired in Sweden on the commercial channels TV3, TV4 and Kanal 5, as well as on SVT, for a couple of years and produced quite a few celebrities in the process. TV3 took it on themselves to gather the most famous Swedish reality show participants from such shows, including Expedition Robinson, Big Brother, Baren, and so forth to run a restaurant in Drop Anchor, Goa, India. The show was never a big success on TV3. The show was filmed in Drop Anchor, Goa. Hosts of this particular show were Dilip Seta and Rakesh Mathur

Club Goa was built upon strong characters and big cultural challenges. In the first series there were former reality TV participants from various shows that were highly familiar to the audience. The journey ended at a beach club in Goa, where celebrities were not just expected to work as bartenders, but also to take responsibility for the bar, the restaurant, marketing, and big events. One after another they were forced to leave the party and return home to a freezing winter. The last one standing on the beach won $500,000.

== Parts of the show ==
Missions to accomplish: For 13 weeks, the celebrities had to successfully run the beach club. Their assignment was to take care of all PR, marketing, events, and serving food and drinks. For the first 8 weeks the participants were divided into two teams. Each week a competition was held that could involve all or just a few of the participants. The competitions were often related to the work at the beach club in some way.

Nomination meeting: Each week, the losing team of the week held a nomination meeting, where they chose the ones who were directly nominated to the weekly final club meeting, where they would risk losing their place in Club Goa. The nominated participant then got to choose who would be sitting on the other "hot seat" in the voting (who would be the election opponent).

Warnings from the program host: The program host could give warnings to participants by handing out yellow cards to anyone who had behaved poorly. The program host also had authority to disqualify participants by giving them a red card. Upon receiving a red card, the participant had to immediately leave Club Goa.

Club meeting: Five days a week, the audience could follow the participants' adventures. Social, professional, and cultural challenges were constantly recurring ingredients. The fifth day would conclude with an elimination process at the club meeting, where the participants would decide which one of them would be forced to leave Club Goa.

The final battle: After 8 weeks the teams were unified into one again. From this point, all remaining participants battled in an individual competition, where only one could be the winner at the end.

== Rules ==
Club Goa's rules were the following:

- The participants were divided into two teams.
- There was a competition each week.
- The losing team had a vote on which team member that was to leave the show.
- In the final all participants voted on the finalist they preferred.
- The participants got different numbers of votes depending on how many weeks they had lasted.
- The finalist with the most votes won the reality show.

== Presenters ==
- Robert Aschberg, Diskutabelt, Baren, Insider
- Paolo Roberto, Fear Factory, Stockholmsnatt, Sökarna

== Entertainment consultants ==
- Nalle Knutsson
- Frida Lundel, Expedition: Robinson, Survival, UnderCover
- Jörgen "Jugge" Nohall

== Participants ==
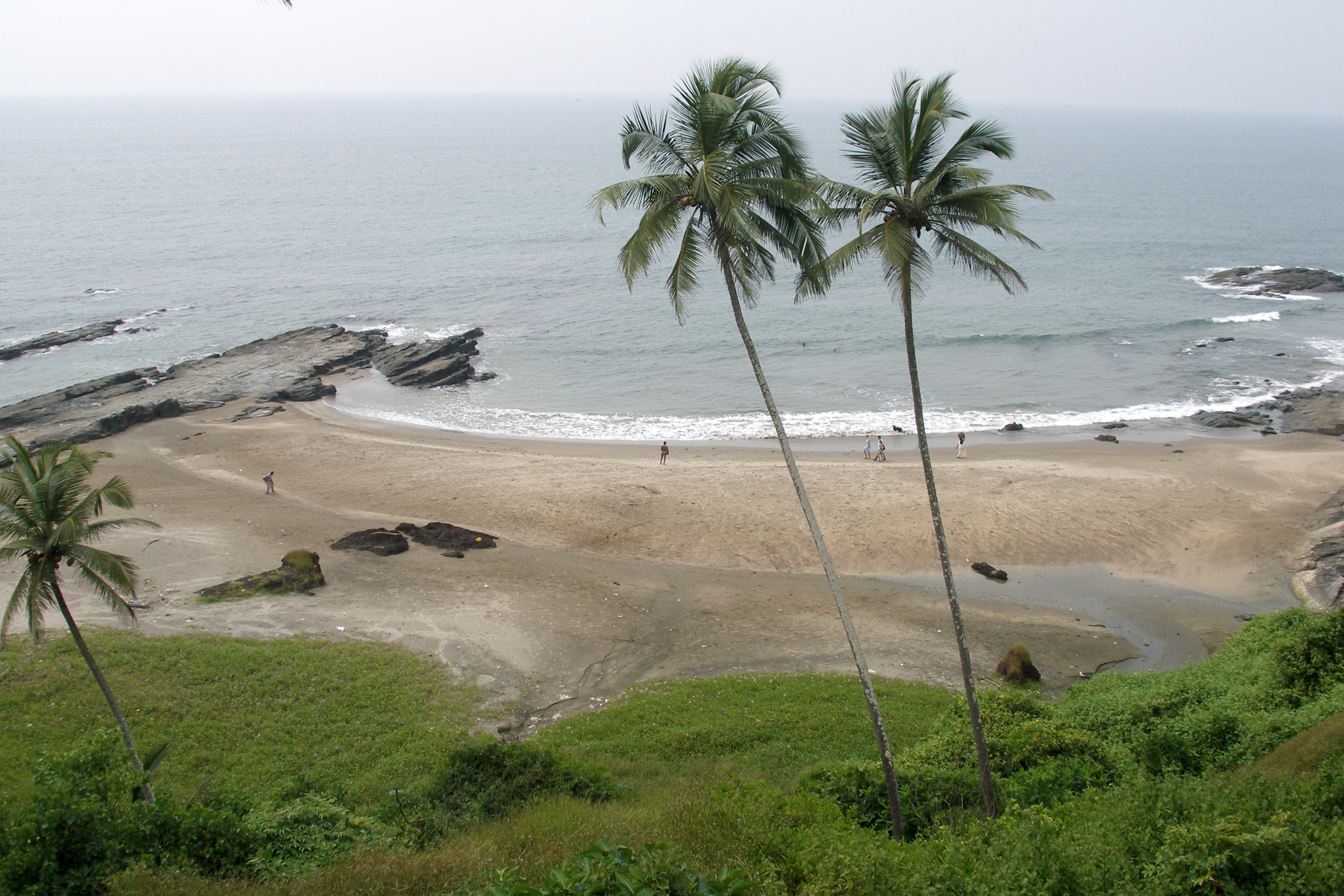
Goa in India where Club Goa was filmed

- Caroline Björkman, Big Brother
- Tess Bylund, Bachelor
- Sebastian Dawkins, Farmen
- Marie Forsberg, Farmen
- Lars Gåre, Expedition: Robinson
- Johan "Molle" Holmberg, Baren (Winner)
- Jan "Blondie" Hammarlöf, Farmen
- Kitty Jutbring, Big Brother
- Niklas "Biffen" Jansson, Villa Medusa
- Jan O. Jansson, Farmen
- Kent Larsen, Expedition: Robinson
- Veronika Larsson, Farmen
- Frida Lundell, Expedition: Robinson, Survival, UnderCover
- Marina Milosevic, Farmen
- Frida Norén, Farmen
- Qristina Ribohn, Farmen, Baren
- Stefan Sahlin, Villa Medusa
- Zübeyde Simsek, Expedition: Robinson
- Benjamin Sorani, Big Brother
- Meral Tasbas, Baren
- Özcan Yildiz, Farmen
