= Jugge Nohall =

Swedish singer and artist

Mark Erik Jörgen "Jugge" Nohall (born 6 September 1964 in Stockholm) is a Swedish singer and artist, who has written a song for the Swedish national final of the Eurovision Song Contest, participated in two reality shows (Club Goa) on Swedish television and worked as a radio talkshow host.
