= Hello Hey =

Single by Victoria Silvstedt

from the album Girl on the Run
- Released: 1999
- Recorded: 1999
- Genre: Dance-pop, Europop
- Length: 3:26
- Label: EMI
- Songwriter(s): Ali Thompson; Andreas Carlsson

Victoria Silvstedt singles chronology
"Hello Hey" (1999)	"Rocksteady Love" (1999)

"Hello Hey" is a debut song by Swedish singer and model Victoria Silvstedt. It was released as a first single off her debut (and, so far, only) album Girl on the Run. The video for the song was shot in Los Angeles in 1999 and was directed by Anders Hallberg.

== Formats and track listings ==
These are the formats and track listings of promotional single releases of "Hello Hey".

CD single

1. "Hello Hey" Radio Edit - 3:26
2. "Hello Hey" Extended - 6:06
3. "Hello Hey" The Poker Train Mix - 6:10 (Ebop, Pokerboys, The*)
4. "Hello Hey" Supernatural Mix Edit - 3:43 (J. Kjellström, J. Udd*, P. Boström*)
5. "Hello Hey" Supernatural Mix Extended - 5:19 (J. Kjellström, J. Udd*, P. Boström*)
6. "Hello Hey" Video

== Chart performance ==
The song made its debut on Swedish Singles Charts at number 7 in 1999. The song stayed on the chart list for 12 weeks overall.

Chart (1999)	Peak position
Swedish Singles Chart	7
