= Filip Berg =

Swedish film and television actor

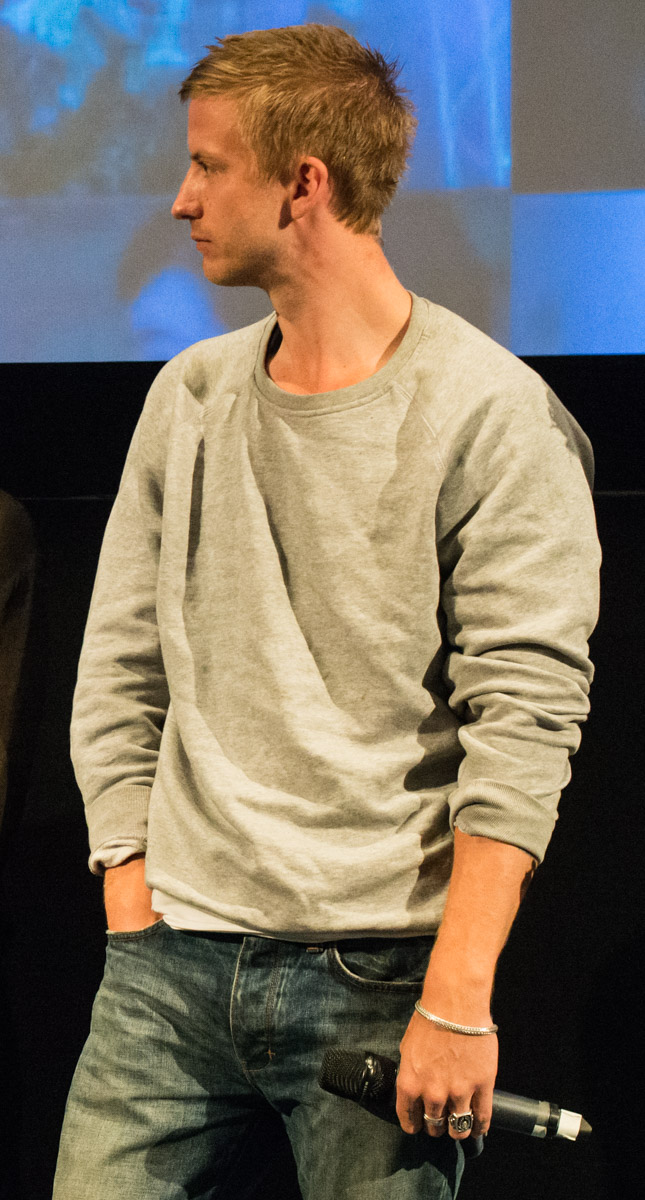
- Filip Berg (2015)
- Born: Filip Niclas Berg; 2 October 1986 (age 38); Danderyd, Stockholm County, Sweden
- Occupation: Actor
- Years active: 2002–present

Filip Niclas Berg (born 2 October 1986) is a Swedish actor who became known to international audiences for his roles Sebbe in the movies The Ketchup Effect and A Man Called Ove, which was nominated for best foreign-language film at the Academy Awards. He also had a leading role in both series of the TV drama, Black Lake.

Berg was born in Danderyd, Stockholm County. As a student he attended the Adolf Fredrik's Music School in Stockholm.

His other roles include a supporting role in the 2003 movie, Ondskan, also starring Andreas Wilson and Gustaf Skarsgård. He played the main character in the Swedish zombie TV series The Last Reality Show.

== Selected filmography ==
Year	Film/television	Role
2002	Vera Med Flera	Linus
2003	Ondskan	Johan
2004	The Ketchup Effect	Sebbe
2005	Livet Enligt Rosa	Harry
2005	Kommissionen	Calle Lagerfelt
2007	Andra avenyn	Jesper 'Dildo' Dillström
2011	Two Little Boys	Jeurgen
2012	The Last Reality Show	Abbe
2013	Crimes of Passion	
2013	Studentfesten	Ian
2013	Orion	Tony Lundblad
2014	Stockholm Stories	Douglas
2015	Odödliga	Isak
2015	A Man Called Ove	Young Ove
2020, 2022, 2024	Bäckström	Kristian Olsson
2021	A Class Apart	Daniel
2024	Whiskey on the Rocks	
2024	Trouble	Conny Rundqvist

== Selected television ==
- Black Lake, 2016, "Svartsjön"
