= Victoria Silvstedt =

Swedish model, actress, singer, and TV personality (born 1974)

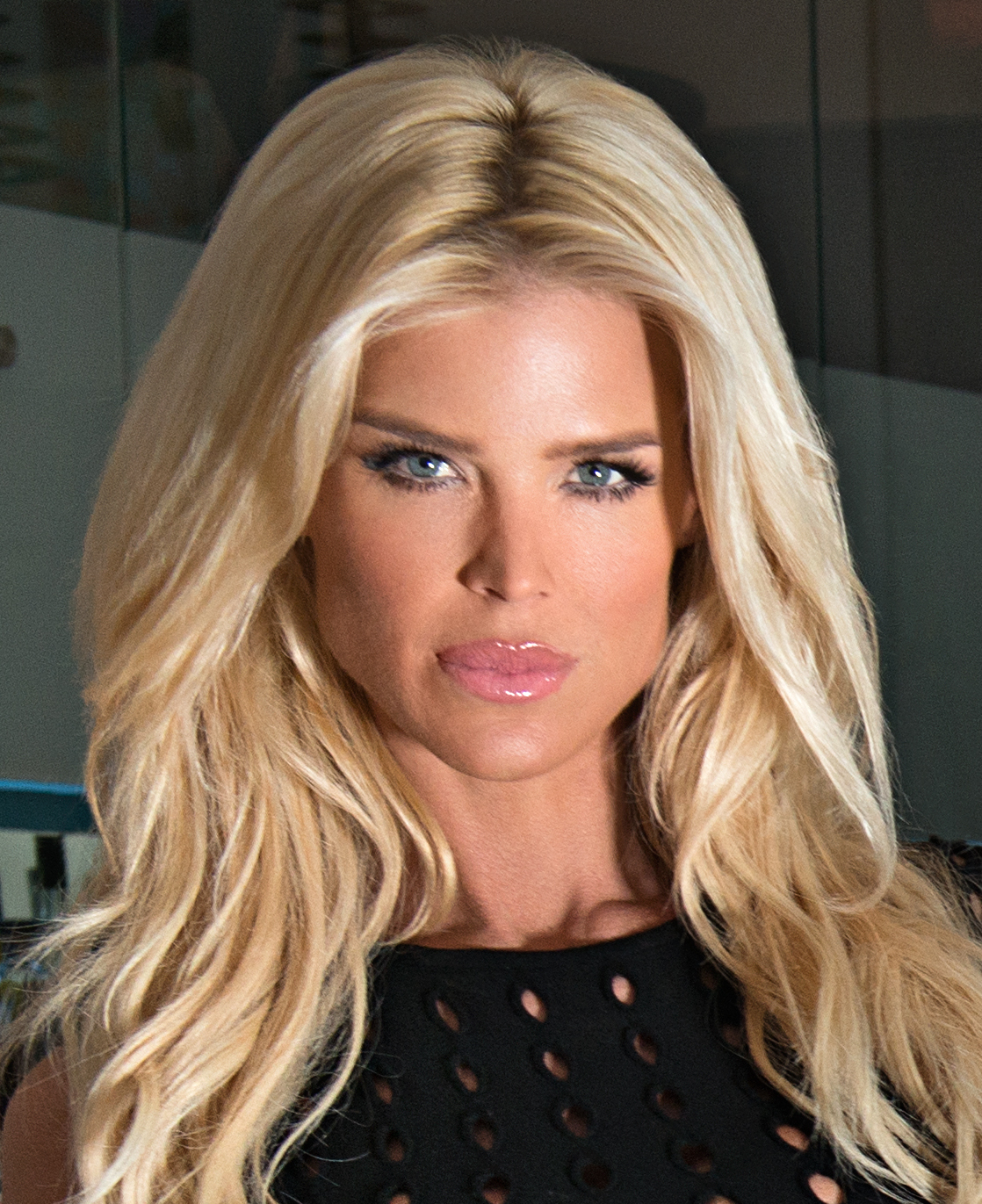
- Silvstedt at the 2019 Cannes Film Festival
- Born: Karin Victoria Silvstedt; 19 September 1974 (age 52); Skelleftehamn, Sweden
- Occupations: Model, actress, singer, television personality
- Beauty pageant titleholder
- Title: Miss World Sweden 1993
- Years active: 1993–present
- Hair color: Blonde
- Eye color: Blue
- Major competitions: Miss World Sweden 1993 (Winner); Miss World 1993 (Top 10)

Playboy centerfold appearance
- December 1996
- Preceded by: Ulrika Ericsson
- Succeeded by: Jami Ferrell

Playboy Playmate of the Year
- 1997
- Preceded by: Stacy Sanches
- Succeeded by: Karen McDougal

Personal details
- Height: 1.79 m (5 ft 10 1/2 in)
- Website: victoriasilvstedt.com

Karin Victoria Silvstedt (born 19 September 1974) is a Swedish actress, singer, Playboy Playmate, television host, and beauty pageant titleholder. She participated in and won the title of Miss World Sweden in 1993 before branching out into modelling. She was first Playmate of the Month for December 1996 and later on, she was named 1997's Playmate of the Year.

== Early life ==
Born in Skelleftehamn, Sweden, Silvstedt was raised in a family of five in Bollnäs, having one older sister and one younger brother. She maintains the Christian faith of her childhood. She was keen on horseback riding and wanted to become a veterinarian.

Silvstedt's father was the captain of a local ski team, and she started alpine skiing at the age of five. In 1989, Silvstedt placed fourth at the Swedish national alpine skiing youth championship, in the giant slalom event won by Pernilla Wiberg. However, an accident in the middle of a skiing competition where she injured her shoulder ended Silvstedt's competitive skiing career at the age of 16.

A few years later, Silvstedt was invited to participate in the Miss Sweden beauty pageant, after her mother and sister had sent some pictures of her to the pageant officials.

== Career ==
=== Modeling ===
Silvstedt participated in the Miss Sweden beauty pageant, and she was chosen to represent her country in the 1993 Miss World pageant in Sun City, South Africa, eventually making the Top 10. Silvstedt was signed up by a modeling agency in Paris, and she started working for various prestigious fashion houses, including Chanel, Christian Dior, Giorgio Armani, Givenchy, Loris Azzaro, and Valentino, appearing in advertisements and fashion shows.

Silvstedt was soon noticed by Hugh Hefner, who invited her to do a photo shoot for Playboy magazine in Los Angeles. She became the December 1996 Playmate of the Month, and was then chosen as the 1997 Playmate of the Year. Silvstedt has since appeared in various Playboy magazines, including Playboy Special Editions, as well as Playboy Videos. In the late 1990s, Silvstedt landed one of the most sought-after modeling contracts in the world, becoming the Guess? spokesmodel, succeeding among others Claudia Schiffer and Anna Nicole Smith.

In the 2000s and 2010s, Silvstedt has continued modeling internationally, appearing in numerous magazines, including FHM, Glamour, GQ, Hello!, Maxim and Vanity Fair, working for various brands such as Lynx, Nike, Renault and Triumph International, and being the cover star for the re-issued Russ Meyer DVDs.

She has been featured on over 500 magazine covers.

=== Acting ===
Silvstedt has worked as an actress since the late 1990s, when she appeared in Hollywood television series such as Malibu, CA and Melrose Place. Since then, Silvstedt has also appeared in a number of Hollywood comedy films, including BASEketball, The Independent, Out Cold, and Boat Trip. Silvstedt has also appeared as a guest actress on Ocean Ave., a Miami-based soap opera, broadcast in Sweden and Florida.

Silvstedt has also starred in films and television series in various European countries, especially in Italy. As a leading actress, she has appeared in Italian films such as La mia vita a stelle e strisce and Un maresciallo in gondola, in which she played Kim Novak. She has also had supporting roles in films like Un'estate al mare and Matrimonio alle Bahamas. In 2010, Silvstedt starred in Just for the Record, a British mockumentary, starring also Steven Berkoff among others (Tagline: "They made the worst film of all time... let the trial begin"). She also had a small role in the French film Heartbreaker, starring Romain Duris and Vanessa Paradis.

As for theatre, Silvstedt has appeared in the Off Broadway production, Pieces (of Ass), during its run in Los Angeles in 2004.

=== Presenting ===
Silvstedt has been presenting numerous television shows and television specials all around the world since the 1990s. She has hosted entertainment shows such as Candid Camera on CBS, Eurotrash on Channel 4, and Wild On! on E!, and appeared as a presenter in various awards shows, including NRJ and World Music Awards. She has also served as a celebrity judge on Project Catwalk, the British reality television series focusing on fashion design.

In 2006, Silvstedt started working as a hostess of La Roue de la fortune in France and La ruota della fortuna in Italy. Both of the shows are based on the popular American game show Wheel of Fortune, and Silvstedt divided her time between Paris and Rome, filming one of the shows for one month at a time, until 2009, when the Italian version was cancelled. As of 2012, Silvsted is no longer part of the French version either.

In 2010, Silvstedt hosted her own television show Sport by Victoria on Eurosport during the 2010 Winter Olympics. The light-hearted programme introduced different winter sports, and it was done both in English and French.

Since 2011, Silvstedt has also hosted numerous Le grand bêtisier television specials on TF1 in France, including the Christmas special Le grand bêtisier de Noël, which attracted over three million viewers and an audience share of 32.7 percent on Christmas Eve 2011.

=== Singing ===
Silvstedt released her dance music album Girl on the Run through the EMI label in 1999. Three singles, "Hello Hey", "Rocksteady Love" featuring Turbo B, and "Party Line", were also released to support the album sales, and the album went gold in Sweden. In 2010, Silvstedt released her fourth single called "Saturday Night", a Whigfield cover.

Silvstedt has said she loves singing, but it is just a hobby, and that she cannot see herself making a full-time career out of it.

Silvstedt returned to music in 2025 by participating in Melodifestivalen 2025, performing the song "Love It!".

=== Reality TV ===
Silvstedt debuted with her own reality television series Victoria Silvstedt: My Perfect Life on E! in 2008. The show has since been aired all around the world, including Europe, Asia, Australia, and the Americas.

The first season covers Silvstedt's personal and work life, following her to St. Tropez, Monaco, Cannes, Paris, Rome, London, Helsinki, Stockholm, Los Angeles, and New York City. Silvstedt also visits her family in Northern Sweden, where she grew up, spending time with her childhood friends, horseback riding et cetera.

In 2016, Silvstedt participated in the Swedish reality series Stjärnorna på godset alongside some of Sweden's best known reality series stars such as Meral Tasbas, Qristina Ribohn and Robban Andersson. The series was broadcast on TV3.

=== Other ventures ===
Having an interest in fashion design, Silvstedt launched her own lingerie collection Very Victoria Silvstedt at London Fashion Week in 2006. The Very Victoria Silvstedt brand was then officially launched for retail in collaboration with the Marie Meili brand in Paris in 2013.

Silvstedt published her autobiography Les Secrets de Victoria. Dans la Tête de Victoria Silvstedt (Jean-Claude Gawsewitch Éditeur), co-written with journalist Christelle Crosnier, in France in 2010.

In 2011, she became an ambassador for Betsafe, the international online sportsbook and casino subsidiary of Swedish gambling giant Betsson, and filmed five different commercials in Mallorca. The Betsafe partnership was discontinued in 2012 but she continued to work for Betsson to promote its StarCasino.it brand in Italy.

== Personal life ==
Silvstedt met Chris Wragge in 1999, when he interviewed her for Entertainment Tonight. They were married in June 2000, and divorced in 2009.

In the early 90's, she was Melania Trump's roommate in Paris, France.

According to the Finnish broadsheet newspaper Keskisuomalainen, Silvstedt earns millions of dollars every year for her work in modelling, television presenting, and promoting various brands and products.

Silvstedt speaks English, French, and Italian, in addition to her native Swedish.

While she does not identify with a particular institutional religion, Silvstedt is a devout Christian. She prays regularly and has expressed her belief that her mother sends angels to protect her.

== Discography ==
=== Albums ===
- Girl on the Run (1999)

=== Singles ===
Title	Year	Peak chart positions	Album
Title	Year	SWE	Album
"Hello Hey"	1999	7	Girl on the Run
"Rocksteady Love" (featuring Turbo B)	1999	10	Girl on the Run
"Saturday Night"	2010	—	Non-album singles
"Love It!"	2025	54	Non-album singles

==== Promotional singles ====
- "Party Line" (2000)

Victoria Fuller	Kona Carmack	Priscilla Taylor	Gillian Bonner	Shauna Sand	Karin Taylor
Angel Boris	Jessica Lee	Jennifer Allan	Nadine Chanz	Ulrika Ericsson	Victoria Silvstedt
