= Anna Åström =

Swedish actress

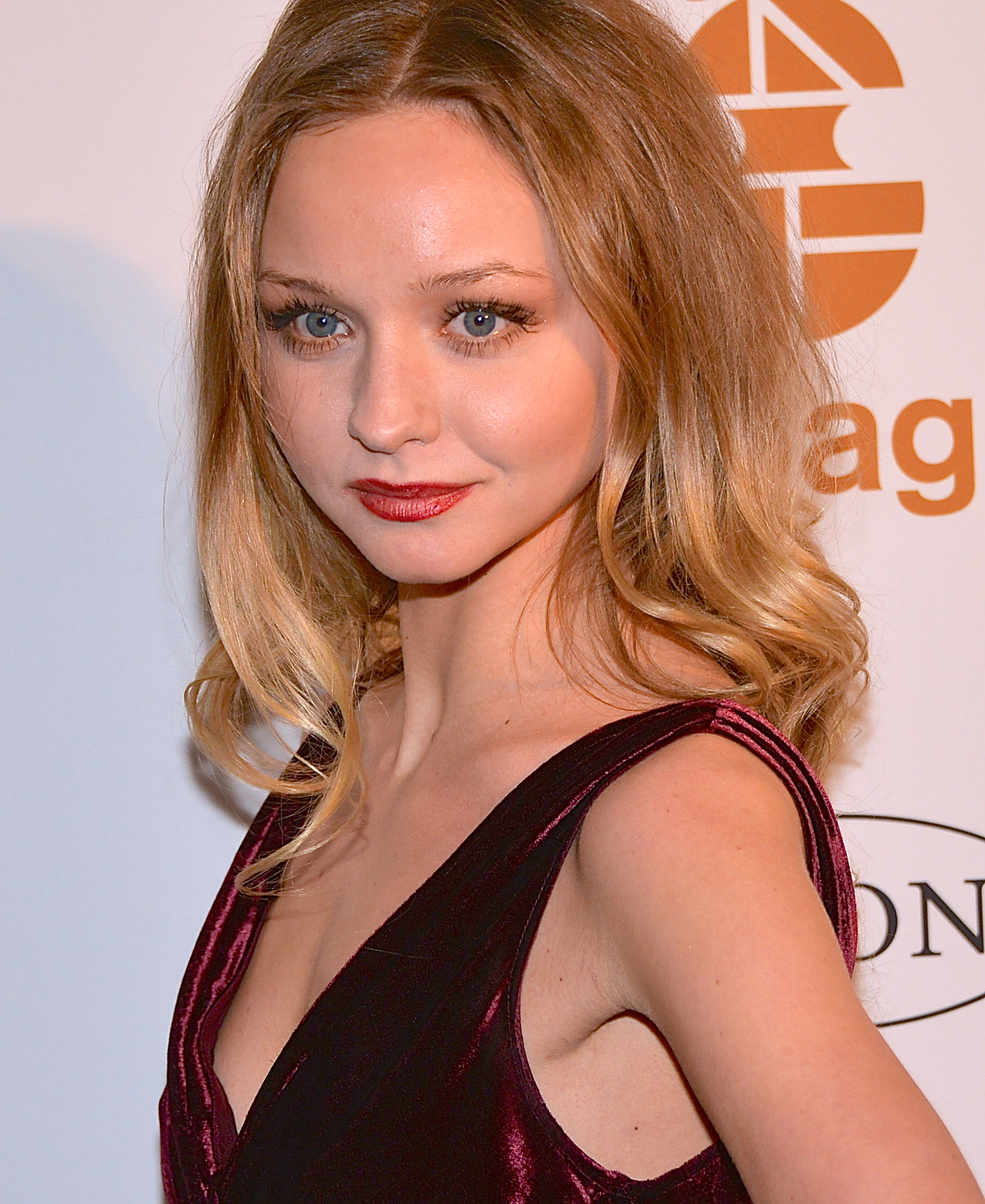
- Anna Åström (2013)
- Born: 5 November 1990 (age 35); Lerum, Sweden
- Occupation: Actress

Anna Åström (born 5 November 1990) is a Swedish actress born in Gråbo, near Lerum.

== Career ==
Anna Åström has been seen in leading roles in features such as Home is Here and Us (Vi) and had supporting roles in a variety of other films, both Swedish and international. She appeared in a number short films and in Swedish TV series, including Black Lake (Svartjön). She has also taken part in many theatre productions at the Stockholm's National Theatre and The Royal dramatic theater.

== Filmography ==
- 2002 Dieselråttor och sjömansmöss (TV Series)
- 2010 Kommissarie Winter (TV Series)
- 2011 Drottningoffret (TV Mini-Series)
- 2011 Irene Huss (TV Series)
- 2011 Welcome to Caligola (Short)
- 2012 Arne Dahl: Ont blod (TV Mini-Series)
- 2012 Shoo bre
- 2012 True people (TV Series)
- 2012 Kontoret (TV Series)
- 2012 Prime-time (Video)
- 2012 Göra slut (Short)
- 2013 Vi
- 2013 The Expedition (Short)
- 2013 - 2014 Vikings (2013 TV series)
- 2014 Viva Hate (TV Mini-Series)
- 2014/II Sleeper Cell (Short)
- 2015 Kerstin Ström (Short)
- 2015 Code 100 (TV Series)
- 2015 Utopic Dystopia (Short)
- 2016 Dans la forêt
- 2016 Home Is Here
- 2016 Svartsjön (TV Series)
- 2018 Excuse Me, I'm Looking for the Ping-pong Room and My Girlfriend (Short)
- 2018 Sisters 1968
- 2019 How You Look at Me
- 2019 Midsommar
