= Young, Dumb and Living Off Mum =

British reality television series

- Genre: Entertainment; Reality television
- Created by: Connie Curran
- Narrated by: Robert Webb
- Country of origin: United Kingdom
- Original language: English
- No. of series: 3
- No. of episodes: 18

Production
- Producer: Byron Archard
- Production location: London
- Production company: Monkey Kingdom

Original release
- Network: BBC Three
- Release: 19 July 2009 – 18 September 2011

Young, Dumb and Living Off Mum is a British entertainment reality series which aired on BBC Three. The show is part of BBC Three's Adult Season, and is narrated by Robert Webb.

== Premise ==
The series follows a group of young adults who have never lived independently. The group live together in a house where they must be responsible for managing their own daily living activities, such as cooking, cleaning and budgeting. Each week they must compete against each other in work challenges set by their parents, designed to help them to develop independence skills. After each assignment, the parents meet to watch the footage of the task and decide who, based on behaviour and performance, should be eliminated from the competition. At the end of the series, the winner receives a round-the-world trip for two people.

== Episodes ==
=== Series 1 (2009) ===
Series 1 was first broadcast in July 2009. A total of eight contestants took part in the series; Danielle Tucker, Dina Massey, Dogan Peri, Jay Tronica, Rachel Hyde, Nicola Hitchen, Orion Nurse and Sean Evans. All of the contestants lived in a house, in Lewisham, South East London, for a total of four weeks. Danielle, Dina and Dogan made it to the final of the show, which was eventually won by Danielle. Her prize was a trip for two around the world.

| | Episode 1 | Episode 2 | Episode 3 | Episode 4 | Episode 5 | Episode 6 |
|---|---|---|---|---|---|---|
| Danielle Tucker | Bottom 4 | Bottom 4 | Bottom 3 | Safe | Safe | Winner (Episode 6) |
| Dogan Peri | Bottom 4 | Safe | Safe | Safe | Safe | Runner-Up (Episode 6) |
| Dina Massey | Safe | Safe | Safe | Safe | Safe | Runner-Up (Episode 6) |
| Sean Evans | Safe | Safe | Bottom 3 | Safe | Eliminated (Episode 5) | |
| Nicola Hitchen | Bottom 4 | Bottom 4 | Safe | Eliminated (Episode 4) | | |
| Rachel Hyde | Safe | Bottom 4 | Eliminated (Episode 3) | | | |
| Jay Tronica | Safe | Eliminated (Episode 2) | | | | |
| Orion Nurse | Eliminated (Episode 1) | | | | | |

=== Series 2 (2010) ===
Series 2 started on Sunday 25 July and followed a new group of contestants. The format of the show remains unchanged from the previous series. This series originally had 8 contestants but a replacement contestant, Duane Johns, was added during the second week.

Chloe was removed from the house for a violent outburst at the night time. Due to this behaviour she could not stay in the house, as she would cause more friction between fellow housemates.

Harri had walked, as she could not take it. Being told once by Chloe, that she cannot sleep in the same bed as Marc, she then eventually gave way later on and packed her bags and booked a taxi back home.

| | Episode 1 | Episode 2 | Episode 3 | Episode 4 | Episode 5 | Episode 6 |
|---|---|---|---|---|---|---|
| Levi Gardiner | Safe | Safe | Bottom 3 | Safe | Safe | Winner (Episode 6) |
| Coran Davies | Safe | Safe | Safe | Safe | Safe | Runner-Up (Episode 6) |
| Danielle Stott | Safe | Safe | Safe | Safe | Bottom 2 | Runner-Up (Episode 6) |
| Adam Jackson-Gane | Safe | Safe | Safe | Bottom 2 | Eliminated (Episode 5) | |
| Iman Fares | Safe | Bottom 3 | Bottom 3 | Eliminated (Episode 4) | | |
| Duane Johns | N/A | Bottom 3 | Eliminated (Episode 3) | | | |
| Marc Campfield | Safe | Eliminated (Episode 2) | | | | |
| Harri Nagel | Walked (Episode 1) | | | | | |
| Chloe Duncalf | Removed (Episode 1) | | | | | |

=== Series 3 (2011) ===
Filming for series 3 began on 20 March and ended on 12 April 2011. It began airing on 14 August 2011 and follows the same format as the previous series'. Just like the previous series', the series is made up of eight contestants; Jack Woodman, Ryan Lee Cox, Tom Latham, Enzo Salerno, Gracie Dudley, Sophie Simpson, Jade Franklin and Ruby-Jo Leverton. Sophie said she was planning to walk after the elimination in Episode 1 after she had been told she was eliminated. Enzo was also considering walking in Episode 2, which was the main reason for his elimination despite arguably having shown the largest attempt in the house to grow up. Tom and Jack attempted to leave at the beginning of Episode 3, yet without any money or a place to go they stayed in the house. After losing her money in Episode 4 Gracie was considering walking, yet eventually decided to stay. In Episode 6 Ruby Jo, Tom & Ryan had to renovate a family home wherein the occupants have certain difficulties in life. Ryan Cox eventually won the series and Ruby Jo has decided to re-enter the competition after her experiences during her stay.

| | Episode 1 | Episode 2 | Episode 3 | Episode 4 | Episode 5 | Episode 6 |
|---|---|---|---|---|---|---|
| Ryan Cox | Bottom 3 | Safe | Bottom 3 | Safe | Safe | Winner (Episode 6) |
| Ruby-Jo Leverton | Safe | Bottom 3 | Bottom 3 | Safe | Safe | Runner-Up (Episode 6) |
| Tom Latham | Safe | Safe | Safe | Bottom 3 | Bottom 2 | Runner-Up (Episode 6) |
| Jack Woodman | Safe | Bottom 3 | Safe | Bottom 3 | Eliminated (Episode 5) | |
| Gracie Dudley | Bottom 3 | Safe | Safe | Eliminated (Episode 4) | | |
| Jade Franklin | Safe | Safe | Eliminated (Episode 3) | | | |
| Enzo Salerno | Safe | Eliminated (Episode 2) | | | | |
| Sophie Simpson | Eliminated (Episode 1) | | | | | |

== International versions ==
A Swedish version called Ung och bortskämd (Young and Spoiled) began airing on SVT on 8 November 2010 and finished on 21 December. An Irish version premiered on TV3 in September 2010. An Australian remake, Young, Lazy and Driving Us Crazy, aired in 2014.
