= Qristina Ribohn =

Swedish reality television contestant (1955–2024)

- Born: Theresa Qristina Ribohn Plückthun; 2 October 1955; Skånela, Sigtuna, Sweden
- Died: 7 February 2024 (aged 68); Karlshamn, Sweden
- Other name: Farmen-Qristina
- Political party: SDP

Theresa Qristina Ribohn Plückthun (2 October 1955 – 7 February 2024), better known as Farmen-Qristina, was a Swedish reality television contestant, drug counselor, and local politician for the Swedish Social Democratic Party. She became known to the Swedish public after appearing on season one of the reality series The Farm in 2001.

== Biography ==
Born in Skånela, Sigtuna Municipality on 2 October 1955, Ribohn focused on children and youths with various problems such as with drugs, as part of the Children and Youth Committee in Karlshamn Municipality. She had been a drug addict for many years; she started using hashish at the age of twelve and heroin at the age of fourteen.

She became drug-free in the early 1990s at the time of the birth of her first son. In 2007, Ribohn, along with a fellow former addict, founded a drug treatment home, a so-called "motivational home", which could house three people at any one time.

She became publicly known after participating as a contestant on the first season of the reality series The Farm in 2001. She participated again as a "joker" in the 2004 season. The series was broadcast on TV4. Ribohn became known for her hot temper and her many arguments with other contestants on the show. She then participated three times in Fort Boyard, also on TV4. She also participated in 2001 in The Bar, which was broadcast on TV3. She further participated in the stop-smoking show Fimpa Nu! in 2004 on TV4 Plus.

In 2005, Ribohn participated, along with some of Sweden's best known reality series contestants, in the reality series Club Goa, which was filmed in Goa and broadcast on TV3. In April 2005, Ribohn's son died after hijacking a taxi and crashing it at high speed, also killing his friend. In 2016, Ribohn participated in the second series of the reality series Realitystjärnorna på godset on TV3 along with television celebrities such as Victoria Silvstedt and Meral Tasbas.

Ribohn died on 7 February 2024, at the age of 68. On the day of her death, as a homage to Ribohn, TV4 published the first season of The Farm on its streaming service.
