= Jan O. Jansson =

Swedish television personality (born 1951)

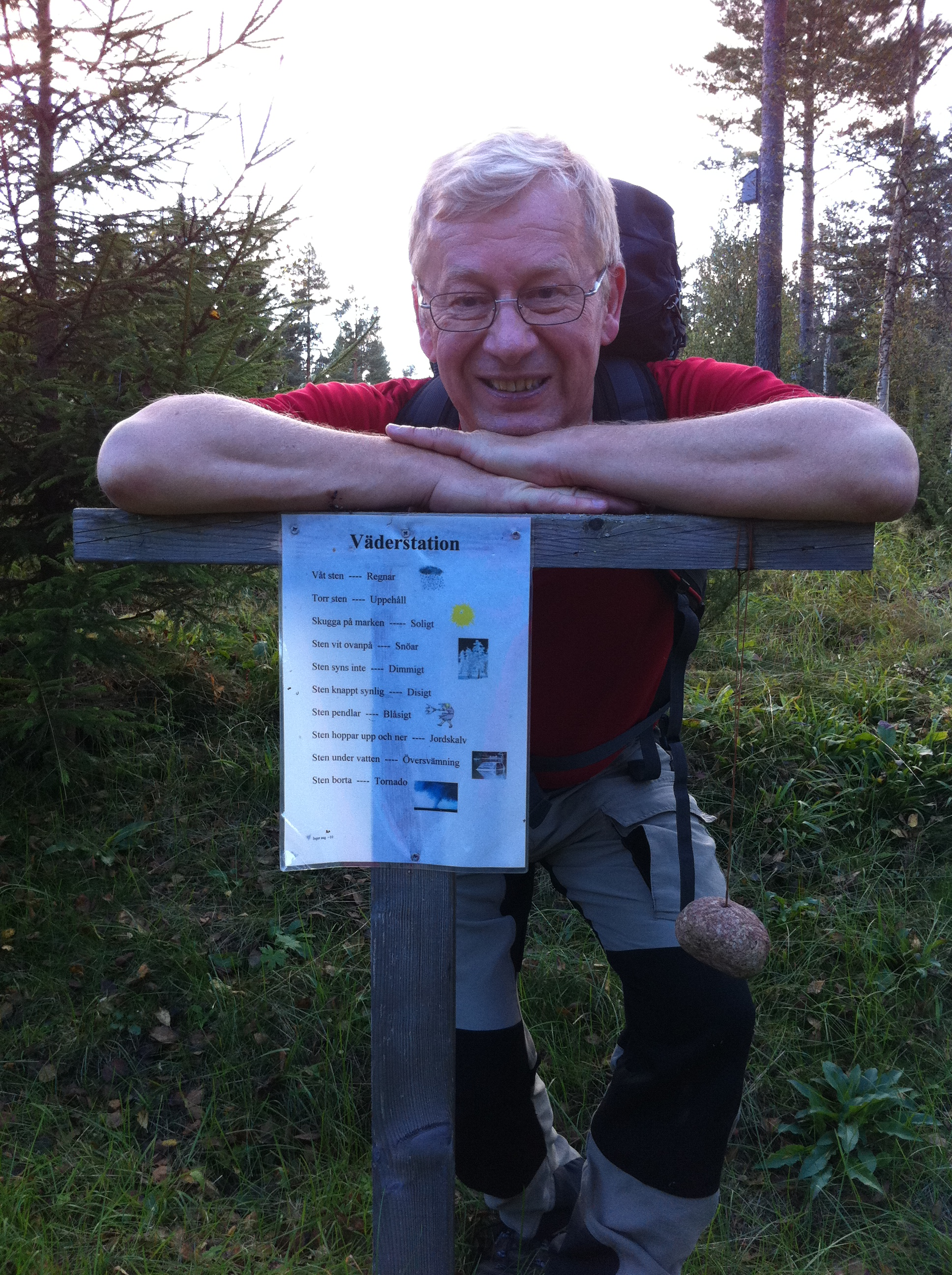
- Jan O. Jansson in September 2011
- Born: Jan Olof Jansson; 8 January 1951 (age 75); Hofors, Sweden
- Other name: Naken-Janne (Nude-Janne)
- Occupations: Television personality, lecturer

Jan Olof Jansson (born 8 January 1951) is a Swedish television personality, who participated in The Farm in 2003 and The Farm Africa in 2004, both of which were broadcast on TV4. He became well known in the Swedish press, with the nickname "Naken-Janne" (lit. 'Nude-Janne') because he walked around nude in most episodes of the two seasons he participated in The Farm.

== Career ==
Jansson was born in Hofors and grew up in Storvik, Sweden. During his youth he enjoyed skiing, orientation and terrain running. He moved to Uppsala in the 1980s, and studied theology and Swedish at Uppsala University. He later worked as a teacher and lecturer.

He became leader of The Naturist Society in Rullsand in 1992.

Between 2003 and 2004, Jansson participated in two seasons of the reality series The Farm, becoming known as an outspoken naturist who walked around nude during most episodes. Both series were broadcast on TV4. In 2003, he appeared nude in the music video for singer Markoolio's song "Vilse i skogen" (Lost in the woods), as the water spirit Neck from Swedish folktales. In 2005 Jansson participated in another reality series called Club Goa on TV3 with many other former participants from different reality series; the show was filmed in Goa, India.

Jansson released a book Den nakna sanningen (The naked truth) in 2005. He also released a music single, a cover of the song "Leende guldbruna ögon".

Today, Jansson works as an insurance trainer and educator for new insurance intermediary classes.
