= The Ketchup Effect =

- Swedish cover
- Directed by: Teresa Fabik
- Written by: Teresa Fabik
- Produced by: Lars Blomgren; Genya Kihlberg
- Starring: Amanda Renberg; Björn Kjellman; Ellen Fjæstad; Linn Persson; Filip Berg; Marcus Hasselborg
- Cinematography: Pär M. Ekberg
- Edited by: Sofia Lindgren
- Music by: Jacob Groth
- Distributed by: NonStop Sales AB; Sandrew Metronome Distribution Sverige AB
- Release date: 30 January 2004
- Running time: 90 minutes
- Country: Sweden
- Language: Swedish

Hip Hip Hora!, known as The Ketchup Effect in most English-speaking countries, is a 2004 Swedish teen movie, directed by Teresa Fabik.

== Plot ==
Friends and future seventh-year (upper primary school) students Sofie, Amanda and Emma anxiously await the start of term. This is virtually no major change education-wise, but a social watershed moment when cliques come into play, more or less serious relationships start being developed, and students, to hear them tell it, leave behind childish things to move into their teens; certainly the three girls are confident in how grown up they now are.

Sofie develops a crush on Mouse, a ninth-year and the local heartthrob. Mouse takes slight notice of her and tells her about an upcoming party. There he tries to hook up Sofie with Sebastian "Sebbe", a relatively quiet and awkward boy from his group. Sebbe and Sofie end up alone and drunk in a bedroom. At the prodding of his friends Sebbe asks for a blow job, which Sofie refuses to do; then Sebbe requests a hand job, which she agrees to do but doesn't know how. He compares the act to emptying a ketchup bottle. Ideally he would have described it more accurately; in a scene featuring prosthetic frontal male nudity, Sofie grabs his penis and, thinking Sebbe meant a glass ketchup bottle, delivers a few sharp strikes with her palm. The situation then breaks up.

After this, knowing that Sebbe has been hurt, Sofie leaves the room and gets extremely drunk. Mouse then proceeds to take advantage of what has occurred by assaulting her while she is passed out. The guys take pictures of her in compromising positions, but Sebbe holds back from joining in. The next day, the pictures of her are all over the place and Mouse is spreading rumours about her. Every time she has to pass him, he and his friends grope her. To the teachers, it looks like he has a harmless crush on her. Her dad finds out when someone sends him a picture anonymously. He tells her that if she didn't dress so provocatively, the guys might not respond in such a crude manner. Sofie leaves and is at the underground station when she runs into Sebbe again. They see Mouse coming and so they run to his house. They have the awkward first conversation, as Sebbe knows more of what went on than she did. They listen to some of his music and he starts to hit on her a bit. At one point, while at the underground station, he compliments her breasts, which she doesn't appreciate and leaves. He realises he's said the wrong thing, but it's too late.

Sofie's best friends don't understand what is going on with her. They hear what other students say about her, and they care what others think of them. They therefore dump her as a friend and try to get accepted into the "in crowd" at school, which means becoming friends with Beatrice, the queen bee. They get invited to a party at someone's house. Sofie shows up at the party, uninvited. Her friends ignore her. She goes to a window and jumps. Next, she is shown being taken to the hospital. Amanda runs after the ambulance and the paramedics let her in. At the hospital, Sofie is shown, not paralysed, but unable to move. Her dad arrives at the hospital, and when Amanda tries to open up to him, he turns a blind eye and goes straight to his daughter's side. After Sofie returns home, Amanda and Emma repeatedly call her mobile phone, but she refuses to answer it. When they come to her house, Sofie tells them to "go to hell" because they did not stand by her like good friends should.

Sofie eventually returns to her school, dressed the way an upper primary school student should. She sees Mouse again and, as a safeguard against future assault, injures him in the groin. He then screams "that fucking whore" and tries to throw a chair at her, but Amanda puts her foot in front of him causing him to slip onto the floor. Everyone in the school is laughing at him, and his friends do not stand behind him. After Sofie and her friends run away, Sebbe runs after them. He proceeds to apologise, and tells her that he likes her a lot and wants to be friends with her. He suggests that he cook them dinner at his place, to which she responds "maybe". The final scene shows the two eating dinner, with a bottle of ketchup on the table.

== Cast ==
- Amanda Renberg as Sofie
- Björn Kjellman as Krister
- Ellen Fjæstad as Amanda
- Linn Persson as Emma
- Filip Berg as Sebbe
- Marcus Hasselborg as Mouse
- Björn Davidsson as Jens
- Carla Abrahamsen as Beatrice
- Robin Lindbom as Loka
- Manuel Bjelke as Manuel
- Margareta Pettersson as Headmaster
- Cattis Olsen as School welfare officer
- Ulrika Dahllöf as Teacher
- Josephine Bauer as Åsa
- Cecilia Ljung as Amanda's mother (scenes deleted)

== Reception ==
Jonathan Trout of the BBC gave the film 3 out of 5 stars.

=== Awards ===
- Teresa Fabik won the Amanda Award for Best Nordic Newcomer in 2004.
- Sofia Lindgren won Guldbagge Award for Best Achievement for editing in 2005.

== Home media ==
The movie was released on DVD in Finland on 11 March 2005.
