= Mathilde Norholt =

Danish actress (born 1983)

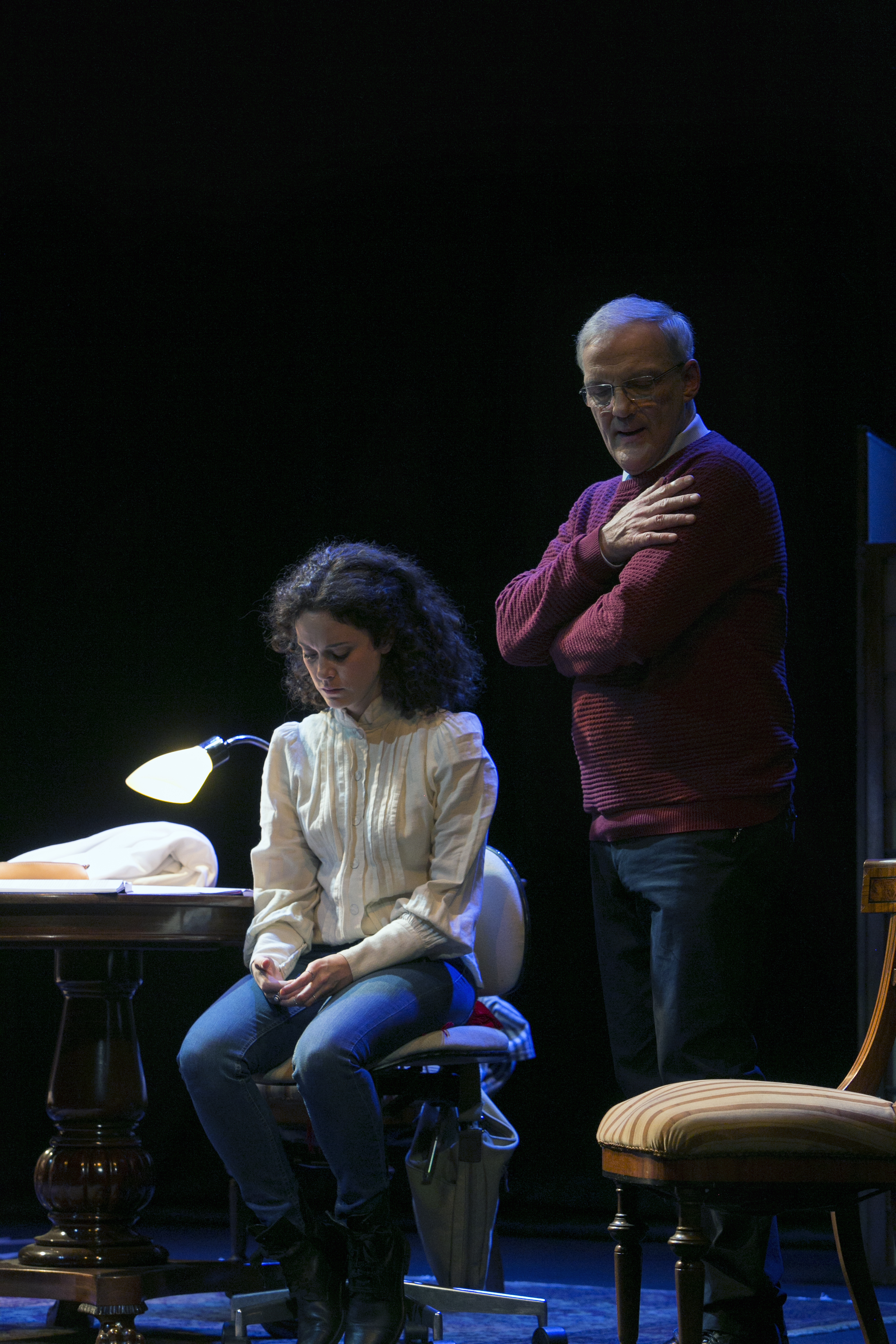
Mathilde Norholt and Preben Kristensen in Folketeatret's production of the play Skærmydsler

Mathilde Norholt (born 1983) is a Danish actress. She is mainly known for her role in the DR television series Lykke and for musicals and theatre.

== Early life and education ==
Mathilde Norholt was born in the Frederiksberg district of Copenhagen to the actress Kirsten Norholt and the actor Flemming Sørensen Norholt. She has no formal education as an actress but has studied multimedia design.

== Career ==
Mathilde Norholt has had roles in Danish television series and short films from an early age but experienced a breakthrough with her role in the DR television series Lykke in 2011. She has also appeared in major theatre and musical performances. In addition to Danish, her first language, she is fluent in English.

== Personal life ==
Norholt lives with her life partner Kristian Errebo Krantz in Copenhagen. They have a daughter, born in June 2017.

== Films ==
- Snøvsen Ta'r Springet (The Snooks in the Limelight) (1994) – Pernille Blomme
- Offscreen (2006) – Mathilde
- Hvid nat (White Night) (2007) – Saras veninde
- Sorte Kugler (What Goes Around) (2009) – Nadja
- Chloe Likes Olivia (short film; first English-speaking role) (2011) - Olivia
- Noget i luften (Something in the Air) (2011) - Sofie
- 4Reality (2013) - Maria

=== Television series ===
- 2900 Happiness (2008–09)
- Kristian (TV series) (2009–11)
- Lykke (TV series) (2011–12)
- Vild med dans (2013)
- Black Lake (2016)
