= Meral Tasbas =

Swedish television personality

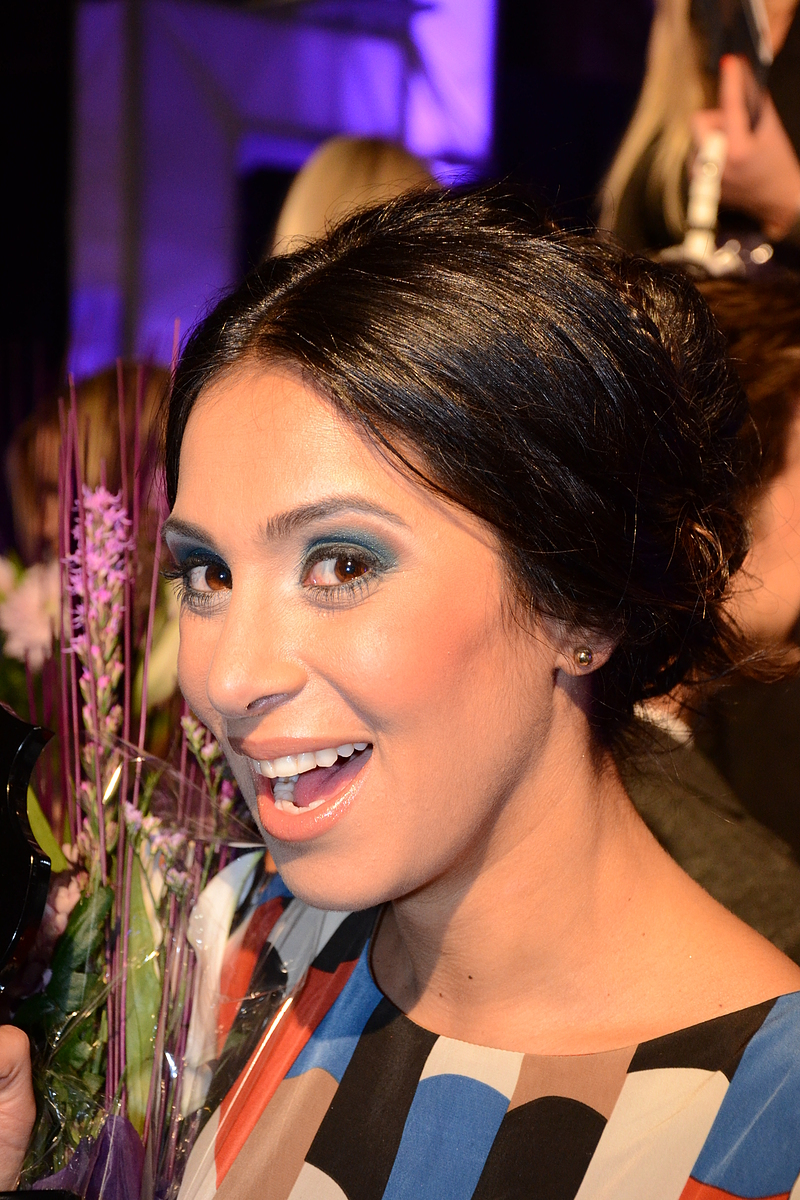
- Meral Tasbas (2011)
- Born: Meral Izabelle Tasbas; 4 April 1979 (age 47); Gothenburg, Sweden
- Occupations: Television personality, singer, actress and television host
- Spouse: Emil Kokot (m. 2004; divorced)

Meral Izabelle Tasbas (born 4 April 1979) is a Swedish television personality, singer, actress and television host. Tasbas is known for appearing as a contestant on all five seasons of the reality show The Bar between 2000 and 2004 on TV3 and for hosting her own television show on TV3 called Meral-TV. She has appeared in some films and released a bilingual Turkish/English language single "Versene" with Marcus Öhrn.

== Career ==
=== Appearance in The Bar ===
Meral Tasbas became a household name when she participated in all five seasons of the reality show The Bar between 2000 and 2004 on Swedish station TV3. Tasbas has also appeared on the Turkish version of The Bar. On the show Tasbas became a fan favourite and was mentioned in the tabloids for her behaviour at many occasions. She received death threats during the second season after an incident in her private life when she was ejected from a mosque in Stockholm for wearing inappropriate clothing.

Tasbas grabbed headlines in 2000 when she became hysterical during a hot air balloon ride along with Norwegian pastor Runar Søgaard and the duo almost crashed into a powerline; she had won the ride after completing tasks at The Bar.

=== Other reality shows ===
Tasbas participated in Club Goa broadcast on Strix Television, and spent one night inside the Big Brother house in 2003 as a celebrity guest. She has also taken part in the Swedish version of 101 Ways to Leave a Gameshow on Kanal 5.

During 2002, Tasbas hosted her own talk show on TV3 called Meral-TV. In 2011, she appeared on the Turkish talk show Arim Balim Petegim.

In 2016, she participated in Realitystjärnorna på godset which was broadcast on TV3, alongside amongst others Victoria Silvstedt and Qristina Ribohn.

=== Music ===
In 2000, Tasbas released her first music single "Versene" which she performed along with singer Marcus Öhrn from the reality show Villa Medusa and Fame Factory. Tasbas sang the Turkish language lyrics with Öhrn rendering the English language verses.

=== Films ===
During 2000, she appeared in a small role in the Swedish movie The Dog Trick alongside Alexander Skarsgård.

In 2011, Tasbas continued her acting career by playing herself in the reality show spoof series called Den Sista Dokusåpan (The last reality show) in which some of Sweden's best-known reality show stars took part and acted as zombies on TV6.

== Personal life ==
Tasbas was born into a Turkish family living in Gothenburg. Tasbas married Emil Kokot on 14 April 2004. She participated in the reality show Club Goa which was filmed on location in India in 2005 but had to leave the show for personal reasons, she divorced Emil Kokot not long after.

Tasbas has admitted that she has undergone at least three plastic surgeries since the age of nineteen: one liposuction on her stomach, one separate surgery on her nose and one on her lips. In 2009, Tasbas appeared in an episode of Plastikkirurgerna (The Plastic Surgeons) on TV4 to discuss her surgeries.

In 2011, Tasbas gained world attention after being seen with American actor John Cusack and revealing they had shown interest in each other.

== Discography ==
Singles

- 2000: "Versene" (with Marcus Öhrn)

== Filmography ==
- 2002 – The Dog Trick (Hundtricket – The Movie)
- 2012 – The Last Reality Show (Den Sista Dokusåpan)
