= Young, Lazy and Driving Us Crazy =

2014 Australian reality television series

- Narrated by: Lawrence Mooney
- Country of origin: Australia
- Original language: English
- No. of series: 1

Production
- Production company: Matchbox Pictures

Original release
- Network: Seven Network
- Release: 13 February 2014

Young, Lazy and Driving Us Crazy is an Australian reality television series that premiered on the Seven Network on 20 February 2014. It is based on the British series Young, Dumb and Living Off Mum.

== Premise ==
The series follows ten young adults, aged 18 to 23, who are portrayed by the show as refusing to grow up or leave home. As part of the format, they must live together in a house and fend for themselves. Each week, they compete in different work challenges set by their parents to test various factors of maturity, ranging from teamwork and responsibility to good old-fashioned hard work. The parents observe the contestants' efforts and vote out the one who has made the least effort. At the end of the series, the contestant who demonstrates they can succeed in the adult world wins a $20,000 trust fund.

== Reception ==
The Sydney Morning Herald called the series "the worst show of 2014". The show debuted to disappointing ratings.
