= Nalle Valtiala =

Swedo-Finnish writer

- Born: Kaarle-Juhani Bertel Valtiala; 2 January 1938 (age 88) Helsinki, Finland

Kaarle-Juhani Bertel "Nalle" Valtiala (born 2 January 1938) is a Finland Swedish writer.

Valtiala graduated from Munksnäs svenska samskola in 1955 and became a candidate of philosophy at the University of Helsinki in 1962. He also studied in the US in 1956–1957 and 1963–1964. He worked as a teacher of Swedish and English at Grankulla samskola 1967–1969, Munksnäs svenska samskola 1976–1979 and Lönnbeckska gymnasiet from 1979.

Valtiala debuted in 1961 with the short story collection Landet Marita.

Valtiala is the son of economist Pertti Virko Valtiala and nurse Margareta Neovius. He married Carita Elisabeth Glad in 1961. He is the father of Robin Valtiala.

Valtiala sat on the board of the Finnish Playwrights Association 1970–1971.

In 2017 Valtiala organized a demonstration against construction work in the center of Kauniainen.

== Published books ==
- Landet Marita och andra short stories (1961)
- Eight Short Stories (1963)
- The Adventure (1965, novel)
- A Red Sports Car (1966, radio play)
- Nalle honey-sucker (1966–1967, play)
- Warning to Man (1968, also published in Finnish as Varokaa lävätä in 1969)
- Noise (1970, radio play, also published in Finnish as Melu)
- Lag scrap lies (1970, cabaret)
- Like the fish in the water (1970, TV drama)
- Mies ei ole mies (1972, radio play, published in Finnish)
- Man tager vad man haver (1972, radio play, also published in Finnish as Otetan miä sattuu ömain)
- Snake in the Sargasso Sea (1972, essays)
- Lotus: A Story of Love (1973, novel)
- Tonga (1974)
- We are going towards a new ice age (1974, radio play, also published in Finnish as Kohti uutta jääkautta)
- Kunnes päivä koitta (1975, radio play, published in Finnish)
- Maailma loppuu Kidepoon (1976, radio play, published in Finnish)
- Rockefeller (1976, radio play)
- It Happens in Aspnäs (1977, TV drama)
- Aikaa ei ole (1978, radio play, published in Finnish)
- Kapteeni Cookin kuolema (1978, radio play, published in Finnish)
- Kuppi teetä (1978, radio play, published in Finnish)
- Journey West, Young Man!: Essays (1978)
- Linnut (1979, radio play, published in Finnish)
- In the Tracks of Mark Twain (1982)
- Nation's Hero (1986)
- Yin and Yang (1987)
- Narcissus (1988)
- A crazy tea party (1991)
- The boy who went underground (1993)
- Tangle (1995)
- On my mother's street (1999)
- On Korpila farm (2003)
- Anna (2005)
- Stinta's book (2007)
- Jonna and the miracle tree (2010)
- Humboldt's parrot (2012)
- Utti's trip (2015)
- Ride South with the wind (2016)
- A gram of morphine now and then: pastiches from the land beyond the law (2017)
- Fiskarkrönika2 (2018)

== Awards and distinctions ==
- Swedish Literature Society Prize, 1966 and 1973
- State Literature Prize, 1969
