= Girl on the Run (album) =

- Album cover

Studio album by Victoria Silvstedt
- Released: September 23, 1999
- Recorded: 1998–1999
- Genres: Eurodance, Europop
- Length: 41:35
- Label: EMI
- Producers: Huma, Sir Martin

Singles from Girl on the Run
- 1. "Hello Hey" Released: 1999; 2. "Rocksteady Love" Released: 1999; 3. "Party Line" Released: 2000

Girl on the Run is Victoria Silvstedt's only studio album. It was released in 1999 and produced and managed by Huma. It includes the three singles: "Hello Hey", "Rocksteady Love" and "Party Line".

== Track listing ==
No.	Title	Writer(s)	Producer(s)	Length
1.	"Rocksteady Love"	Durron Butler		3:56
2.	"Girl on the Run"	Ali Thompson; Andreas Carlsson	Daniel Papalexis; Kadir Taysir	3:12
3.	"Hello Hey"			3:26
4.	"Waste of Time"			3:17
5.	"Astro Girl"			3:34
6.	"Just Can't Live without You"			3:03
7.	"Could You Be the One?"			3:29
8.	"Heating Sun"			3:01
9.	"Party Line"	Robin Rex	Dean'n, Robert Uhlmann	3:30
10.	"I Will Follow"	Joakim Udd; Johan Fjellström; Peter Boström	Fredrik Andersson	3:08
11.	"Falling for You"		Ronny Lahti	4:05
12.	"Still Want You"			3:16

== Chart performance ==
Chart (1999)	Peak position
Swedish Album Chart	27
