= Sisu KB-124 =

Sisu KB-124 and KB-121
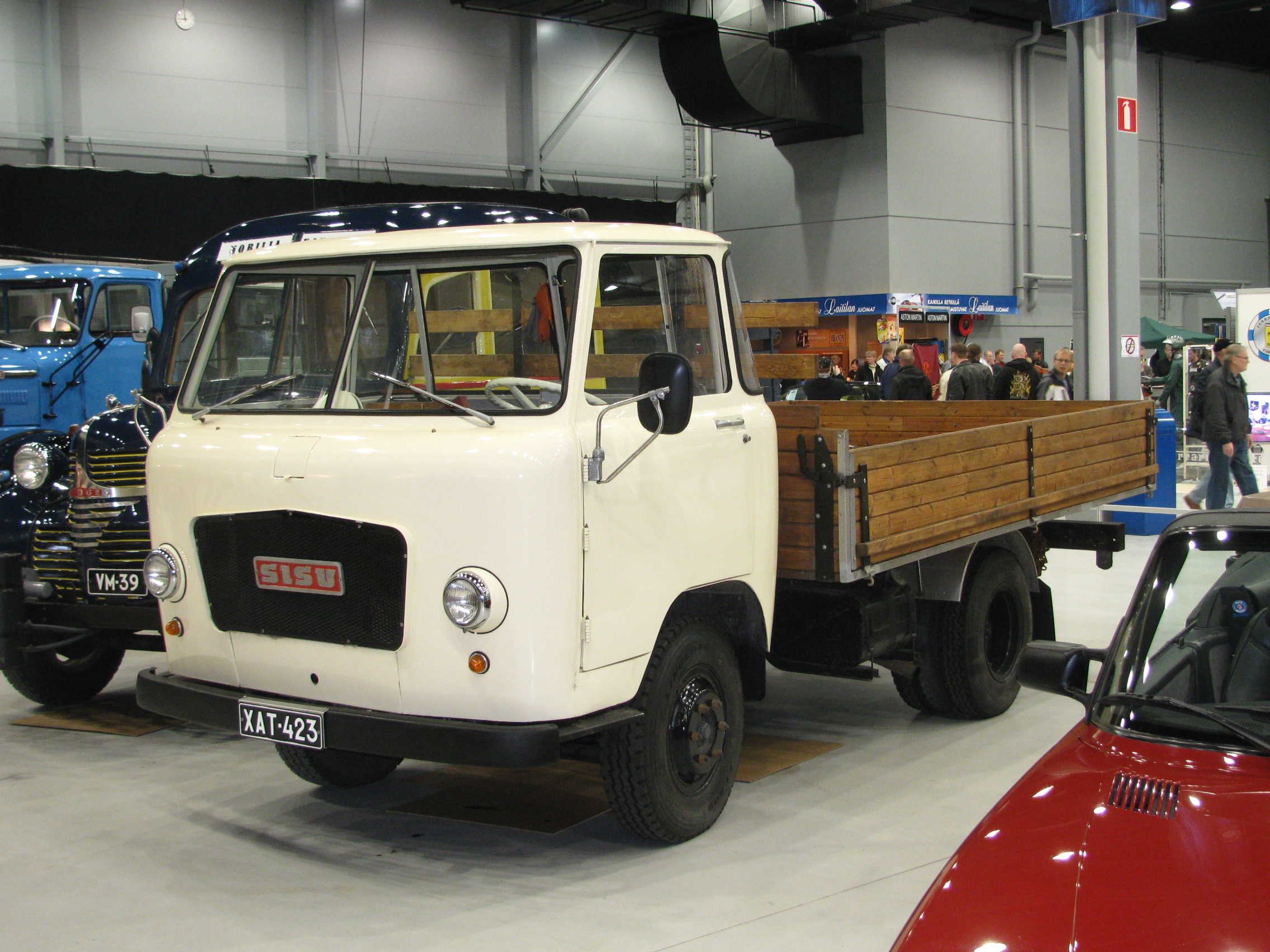

Overview
- Manufacturer: Oy Suomen Autoteollisuus Ab
- Also called: Nalle-Sisu
- Production: KB-124: 1961–1968; KB-121: 1968–ca. 1972
- Assembly: Karis, Finland

Body and chassis
- Layout: 4×2

Powertrain
- Engine: Sisu petrol and Ford diesel engines 52.2–62.7 kW (70.0–84.1 hp) ^{→ table}
- Transmission: 4+1 manual; 2nd, 3rd and 4th gears with synchromesh

Dimensions
- Wheelbase: 2,500–4,000 mm (98.4–157.5 in) ^{→ table}

Chronology
- Predecessor: Sisu KB-24

Sisu KB-124 was a two-axle lorry and special vehicle chassis made by the Finnish heavy vehicle manufacturer Suomen Autoteollisuus (SAT). It was a six-tonne delivery lorry which was developed to follow the KB-24. The KB-124 was produced from 1961 until 1968, when it was replaced by the similar KB-121 with increased permitted load. Production ceased in about 1972.

The marketing name for the vehicle was Nalle-Sisu, "Teddy-Bear-Sisu". In addition to lorries, the chassis was bodied as fire engines, mobile shops and small buses by coachbuilders.

== Development ==
The old-fashioned looking cabin of the KB-24 was modernised in the KB-124 and made more spacious to make it competitive with the Volvo Snabbe. As a drawback, the vehicle lost a part of its key strength, agility. The new Nalle could not be driven through some of the tightest curves, which the KB-24 still could handle.

The total weight of the truck was increased by 300 kilograms (660 lb) to 6,300 kilograms (13,900 lb) and the model name was changed from KB-124 to KB-121 in 1968, after recommendation from the Ministry of Transport and Public Works.

== Production ==
The main customers were Finnish government institutions. At the beginning of November 1968 the State Council approved an order of 50–60 Nalle-Sisus, of which 34 units were for Post and Telegraph Administration, 15 for the State Railways, and few units were for other public institutions. Initially the State Railways had suggested purchasing Fargo FK 500 lorries instead because their unit price was just 16 200 marks, instead of Sisu's 20 612 marks. However, the domestic origin weighed in favour of Sisus.

Selecting the domestic option was not self-evident. At the time, there were many news articles for and against the domestic options. In 1971 the state chose buying 53 Fargos for a total of 1.2 million marks; the minister of transport, Kalervo Haapasalo, commented that the domestic vehicle production was "small-time business".

SAT tried to end the Nalle production several times, but each time some government institution decided to order a series of a few dozen units, which the company then produced.

== Technical data ==
=== Engine ===
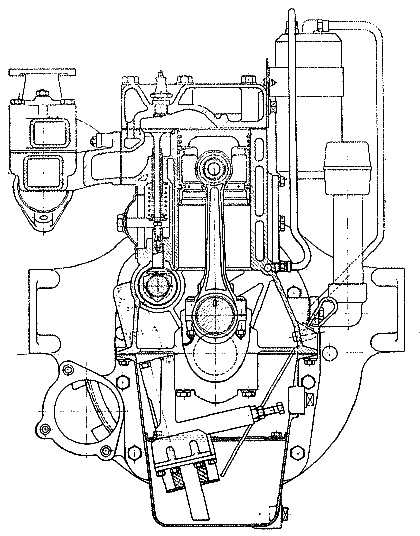
Four-cylinder Sisu AMA side valve engine.

At the beginning the engine selection consisted the same models which were used in the previous KB-24: the utterly outdated, in-house produced four-cylinder 3.5-litre Sisu AMA side valve petrol engine with an output of 70 hp, and four-cylinder 3.6-litre Ford Dagenham diesel with the same output.

A stronger 4-cylinder 4.16-litre Ford Dagenham diesel with 84 horsepower was introduced in 1967.

| Model name extension | SA | SD | BG |
|---|---|---|---|
| Make and model | Sisu AMA | Ford Dagenham | Ford Trader |
| Introduced | 1961 | 1961 | 1967 |
| Description | L4 petrol | L4 diesel | L4 diesel |
| Displacement | 3 502 cm³ | 3 613 cm³ | 4 160 cm³ |
| Max. output | 52.2 kW (70.0 hp) /3200 1/min | 52.2 kW (70.0 hp) /2500 1/min | 62.7 kW (84.1 hp) |
| Max. torque | 215 N⋅m (159 lb⋅ft) /1300 1/min | 227 N⋅m (167 lb⋅ft) /1600 1/min | (no data) |
| Compression ratio | 6.7:1 | 16:1 | (no data) |

=== Chassis and transmission ===
The frame side beams are U-profile that are 150 millimetres (5.9 in) high and 75 millimetres (3.0 in) wide, and produced from 5-millimetre (0.20 in) thick steel. The frame width measured from outer edge is 750 millimetres (30 in).

The clutch with 280-millimetre (11 in) diameter is dry single-plate type and features torsional damping. The gearbox includes four speed forward and reverse; the second, third and fourth gear are with synchromesh. The transmission shaft has two universal joints. The rear axle has a hypoid gear set.

The forged front axle beam is I-profile shape and there is a drop in the middle. The axles are produced by Kirkstall. Suspension is carried out by leaf springs 1,200 millimetres (47 in) long and 2.5 inches (64 mm) wide. Both front and rear axle are equipped with telescopic shock absorbers. The standard wheel size is 7.50 – 16" and 5.50 – 20" was available as an option.

The service brake consists of hydraulically operated drum brakes, which are same size on the front and the rear axle. Initially a dual-circuit system with vacuum servo was optional; later servo became standard. The handbrake works mechanically.

Steering system is worm gear type.

=== Cabin and superstructures ===
The full-steel cabin used on lorry models represents own production of SAT. Compared to the previous model, it was more upholstered and better insulated. In cabin design the producer had paid attention on good visibility. The windscreen is split and both halves are curved. Both sides have separate windscreen wipers. An extended five-seat cabin was available as a special order.

The electrical system is 12-volt and the vehicle is equipped with an 84-Ah battery. A 146-Ah battery was available as an option. In earlier models the fuel tank capacity is 60 litres (13 imp gal; 16 US gal) and it is placed on the right side. Later it was placed on the left side and the capacity was 55 litres (12 imp gal; 15 US gal). The bus chassis were delivered with a 120-litre (26 imp gal; 32 US gal) tank which was optionally available for lorries as well.

=== Dimensions and weights ===
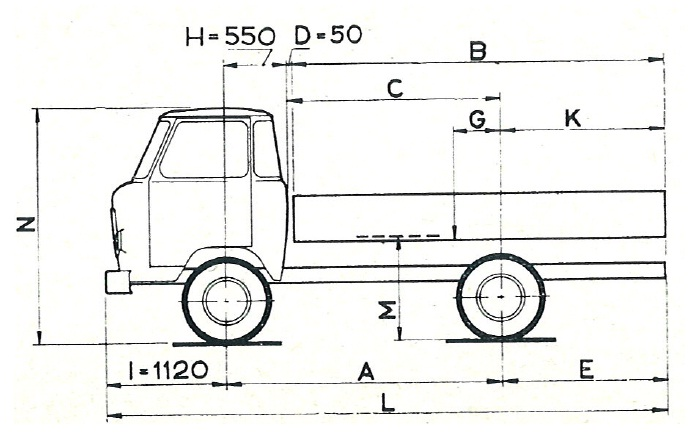

| Wheelbase, lorry models | 2,500 mm (98.4 in) | 3,200 mm (126.0 in) | 4,000 mm (157.5 in) |
Dimensions of KB-124 and different values of KB-121
| B: Platform maximum outer length with permitted weight | 3,400 mm (133.9 in); 3,100 mm (122.0 in) | 4,500 mm (177.2 in); 4,200 mm (165.4 in) | 5,800 mm (228.3 in); 5,500 mm (216.5 in) |
| E: Rear overhang with permitted weight | 1,500 mm (59.1 in); 1,250 mm (49.2 in) | 1,900 mm (74.8 in); 1,650 mm (65.0 in) | 2,400 mm (94.5 in); 2,150 mm (84.6 in) |
| B: Platform maximum outer length after special permit | 3,350 mm (131.9 in) | 4,450 mm (175.2 in) | 5,750 mm (226.4 in) |
| E: Rear overhang after special permit | 1,500 mm (59.1 in) | 1,900 mm (74.8 in) | 2,400 mm (94.5 in) |
| G: Distance between the load gravity point and rear axle | 225 mm (8.9 in); 350 mm (13.8 in) | 375 mm (14.8 in); 500 mm (19.7 in) | 525 mm (20.7 in); 650 mm (25.6 in) |
| L: Vehicle length with the longest platform | 5,120 mm (201.6 in); 4,850 mm (190.9 in) | 6,220 mm (244.9 in); 5,950 mm (234.3 in) | 7,520 mm (296.1 in); 7,250 mm (285.4 in) |
| Vehicle width | 2,040 mm (80.3 in); 2,000 mm (78.7 in) | | |
| N: Vehicle height, unladen | 2,200 mm (86.6 in) | | |
| Track, front | 1,565 mm (61.6 in) | | |
| Track, rear | 1,500 mm (59.1 in) | | |
| M: Platform height, laden | 940 mm (37.0 in) | | |
| Turning radius, measured from outer front wheel | 5,000 mm (196.9 in); 5,100 mm (200.8 in) | 6,900 mm (271.7 in); 6,200 mm (244.1 in) | 8,300 mm (326.8 in); 6,800 mm (267.7 in) |
Weights of KB-124 and different values of KB-121
| Max. permitted load on public roads | 6,000 kg (13,227.7 lb); 6,300 kg (13,889.1 lb) | | |
| Rear axle weight | 4,000 kg (8,818.5 lb) | | |
| Front axle weight | 2,000 kg (4,409.2 lb) 2,300 kg (5,070.6 lb) | | |
| Chassis kerb weight | 2,140 kg (4,717.9 lb); 2,190 kg (4,828.1 lb) | 2,200 kg (4,850.2 lb); 2,320 kg (5,114.7 lb) | 2,360 kg (5,202.9 lb); 2,480 kg (5,467.5 lb) |
| Capacity including platform | 3,860 kg (8,509.8 lb); 4,110 kg (9,061.0 lb) | 3,800 kg (8,377.6 lb); 3,980 kg (8,774.4 lb) | 3,650 kg (8,046.9 lb); 3,820 kg (8,421.7 lb) |

== Characteristics ==
The platform width of 1.85 metres (6 ft 1 in) was good for agility, but became problematic when standard pallets became more common. The contemporary standard pallets could not be placed two-across the width. The State Railways planned to modify the vehicles by replacing the platforms with the two-metre (6 ft 7 in) wide type, but the plan was abandoned.

== Sources ==
- Mäkipirtti, Markku (2011). Sisu. Ajoneuvot Suomessa (in Finnish). Vol. 4 (2. ed.). Tampere: Apali Oy. ISBN 978-952-5877-05-2.
- Blomberg, Olli (2006). Suomalaista Sisua vuodesta 1931 – Monialaosaajasta kuorma-autotehtaaksi [Finnish Sisu since 1931 – From multi-industrial expert to lorry factory] (in Finnish). Karis: Oy Sisu Auto Ab. ISBN 952-91-4918-2.
