= Victor von Schirach =

Swedish actor, director, and producer

- Born: Victor Apollinaire Bartolomei von Schirach-Szmigiel; 24 May 1984 (age 42)
- Occupation: Actor
- Years active: 2006 – present

Victor Apollinaire Bartolomei von Schirach-Szmigiel (born 24 May 1984), known professionally as Victor von Schirach, is a Swedish actor, director and producer from Stockholm, Sweden.

== Career ==
After attending several smaller drama institutes, he graduated from The Academy of Music and Drama at the Gothenburg University in 2012. Von Schirach got his breakthrough in 2011 with the popular TV-series Elsa's World as the flamboyant Johan, one of the main characters. The show was seen by 1.4 million Swedish viewers.

In 2012 von Schirach played the main character Janne in the Swedish feature film Aerobics - A Love Story directed by Anders Rune and in the upcoming sequel of the Swedish TV series The Bridge which was nominated for a BAFTA award for Best International Television Series.

== Filmography ==
Cinema appearances

Year	Title	Role	Notes
2009	Hjälp	Assistant of Dan Carter (Chevy Chase)	
2011	Irene Huss - En man med litet ansikte	Stefan Sandberg	
2012	Arne Dahl - Ont blood	Tommy Nyberg	
2013	Aerobics	Janne	
2013	The Bridge II	Thomas	

Television appearances

Year	Title	Role	Notes
2011	Elsas Värld	Johan	All episodes (2011–2012)
2019	The Mallorca Files	Jens	S1:E10 “The Ex-Factor”
