= Young and Spoiled =

Swedish reality television series

- Country of origin: Sweden
- Original language: Swedish

Original release
- Network: SVT, TV3
- Release: 8 November 2010

Young and Spoiled (Swedish: Ung och bortskämd) is the Swedish version of the British reality series Young, Dumb and Living Off Mum which is broadcast on SVT and, since February 2016, on TV3. The series follows young adults who are pampered by their parents. They are sent to a house to live together and become more independent from their parents.

The two first seasons were broadcast on SVT in 2010 and 2012, while a third season was broadcast on TV3 in February 2016.
