= Sisu KB-24 =

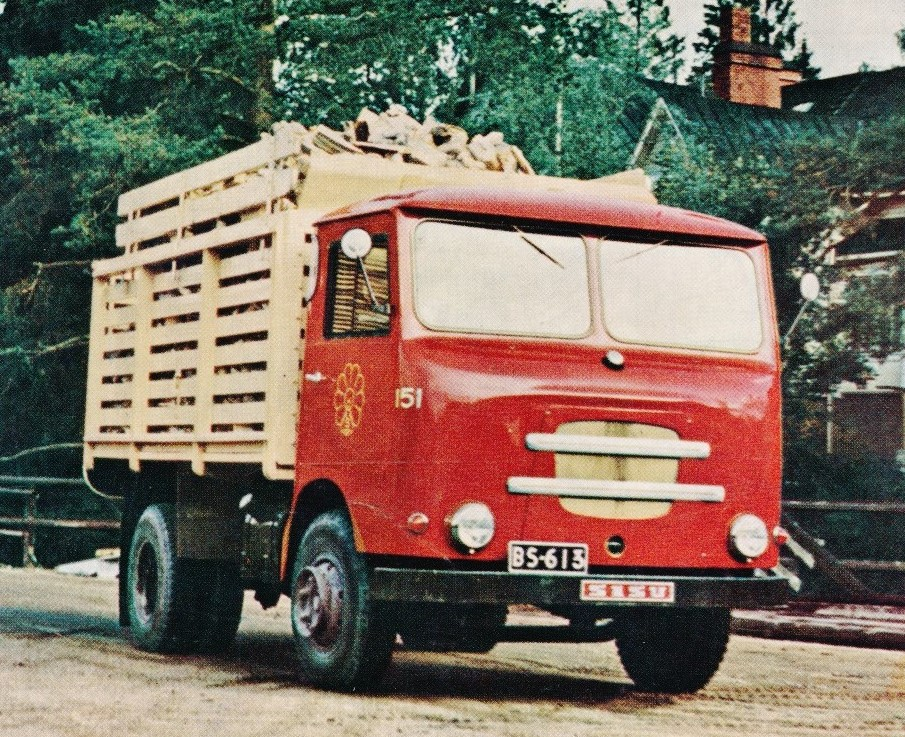

Overview
- Manufacturer: Oy Suomen Autoteollisuus Ab
- Also called: Nalle-Sisu
- Production: 1955–1960
- Assembly: Karis, Finland

Body and chassis
- Layout: 4×2
- Related: Sisu KB-48

Powertrain
- Engine: petrol models: Sisu AMA, 4-cyl. in-line, 52.2 kW (70.0 hp) /3200 1/min; diesel models: Ford Dagenham, 4-cyl. in-line, 52.2 kW (70.0 hp)
- Transmission: 4+1 manual, forward gears with synchromesh

Dimensions
- Wheelbase: 2,500–4,000 mm (98.4–157.5 in)
- Length: lorries: 5,100–7,650 mm (200.8–301.2 in)
- Width: lorries: 1,950 mm (76.8 in)

Chronology
- Successor: Sisu KB-124

Sisu KB-24 is a two-axle lorry and special vehicle chassis made by the Finnish heavy vehicle manufacturer Suomen Autoteollisuus (SAT) from 1955 to 1960. It is a six-tonne delivery lorry planned to operate on narrow streets in Finnish cities.

The marketing name for the vehicle was Nalle-Sisu, "Teddy-Bear-Sisu". The power options included petrol and diesel motors. In addition to lorries, the chassis were bodied as fire engines, mobile shops and small buses by coachbuilders.

KB-24 was replaced by 1961 introduced KB-124, also called Nalle-Sisu.

== Development ==
The new model was developed under supervision of Nils Fagerstedt and Senior Engineer Pentti E. Lehtinen. The objective was to design the lorry as light as possible with the biggest possible load capacity. The tyre size selected was 7.50-16", which allowed 1 000 kg load per unit and also a low platform height, and therefore limited the total weight to 6 tonnes. The wheelbase was 2 500 mm and the outer dimensions were small, making the lorry agile. A forward-control cabin enabled a 3 450 mm platform length. In order to reduce weight, the frame was joined together completely by welding, instead of riveting, which had been the case in every previous Sisu model. The steel used had almost 50% better tensile strength than the materials used by then. By these actions a weight saving of over 100 kg was reached.

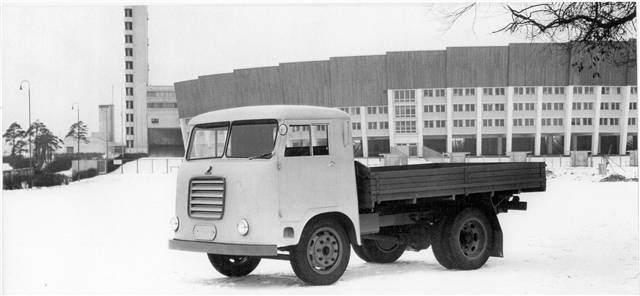
The first prototype, "Winnie the Pooh" at the Helsinki Olympic Stadium.

Although SAT had its own axle factory, the company decided to source the axles from another company due to low volumes. Kirkstall axles were selected due to the 50-degree turning angle of inner wheel; this enabled a small turning radius. For the engine was selected in-house produced underpowered, four-cylinder Sisu AMA, which was a shortened version of very outdated six-cylinder Sisu AMG.

The designing time took total three years, largely due to the new frame construction, before the first prototype, nicknamed Nalle Puh ("Winnie the Pooh") was produced in 1955. The agility was thoroughly tested in Helsinki at gateways and corners known to be difficult to manoeuvre. Based on the experiences, the door handles were replaced by recessed type, decreasing the maximum width by 50 mm. The prototype featured a wooden-frame cabin produced by Karia, but production models were with completely steel structured type, being the first Sisus with full-steel cabins.

== Production ==
KB-24 was introduced in 1956. It was available in three wheelbase options. In addition to lorries, the chassis were also bodied as buses and mobile shops; the first fire engine application was produced in 1957.

The model was produced in small numbers, only 100–150 units annually. The production followed the principle, in which the same team did the assembly work from beginning to ready vehicles. It was replaced by the 1961 introduced KB-124, which was also called Nalle-Sisu.

== Technical data ==
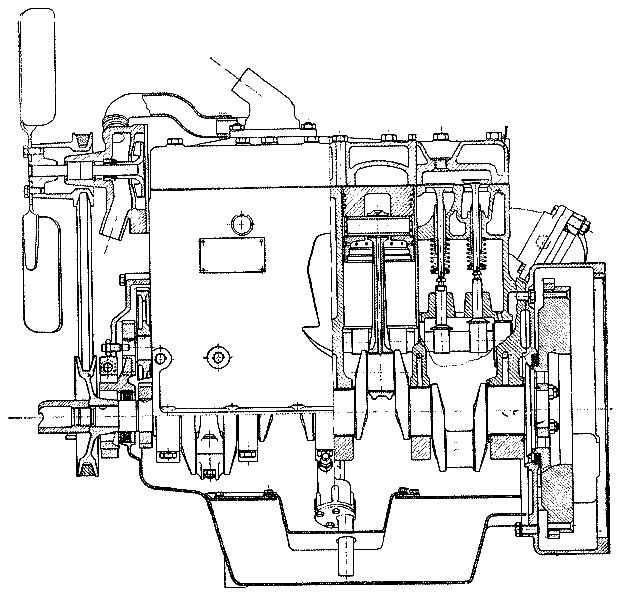
Four-cylinder Sisu AMA SV-engine.

=== Engine ===
The initially offered, in-house produced engine is straight, four-cylinder 3.5-litre Sisu AMA, of which output is 70 hp /3200 1/min and maximum torque 215 Nm /1300 1/min. The cylinder bore is 101.6 mm and stroke 108.0 mm, and the compression ratio is 6.7:1. The technically outdated side-valve petrol engine was based on American Hercules, of which licence production SAT had started in 1940. KB-24 was one of the lasts Sisus to be powered by this engine. The AMA engine was produced with two types of carburettors: Zenith-Stromberg EX22 and Carter 413S. The air filter is oil bath type.

In 1958 Nalle became available with four-cylinder Ford Dagenham diesel engine, of which displacement is 3.61 litres and output 70 hp. The model with Ford engine was KB-24D.

=== Chassis and transmission ===
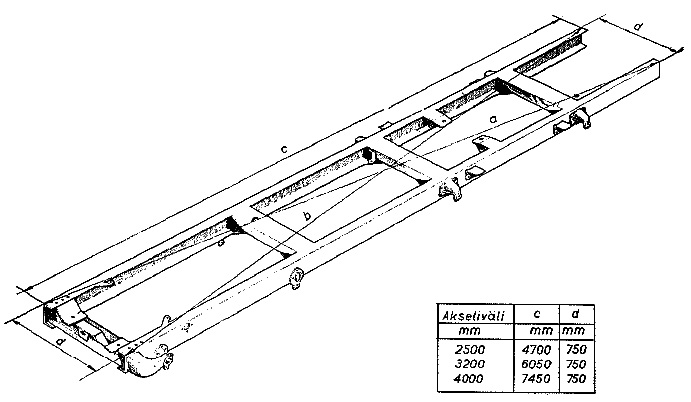
Frame of Nalle-Sisu.

The frame is produced from reinforced steel type V6A with tensile strength of 60 kg /mm². The frame was the first in Sisu to be completely constructed by welding. The frame was available with wheelbase options: 2,500 mm (98.4 in), 3,200 mm (126.0 in) and 4,000 mm (157.5 in).

The 11"-clutch is single-plate and dry type. The transmission features four speed forward, of which 2nd, 3rd and 4th gears are with synchromesh, and one reverse gear. The rear axle is with hypoid bevel gear set.

The front axle is rigid type, with forged beam and drop in the middle. The king pins are with slide bearing bushings. The axles were produced by Kirkstall. The suspension consists of 2½" wide and 1 200 mm long half-elliptic leaf springs, with additional auxiliary springs on the rear axle, and telescopic hydraulic double-acting shock absorbers. The wheel size is 7.50 – 16".

The service brakes are hydraulically operated drum brakes, which are similar type both on the rear and the front axle. Each brake includes two slave cylinders. The hand brake is mechanically operated and includes a separate drum brake behind the gear box, affecting on transmission.

The steering system is worm gear type and produced by Ross.

=== Cabin and superstructures ===
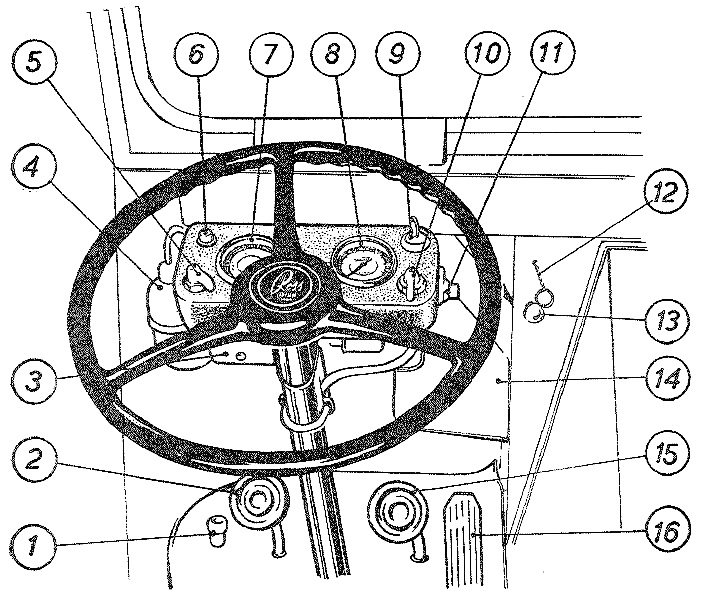
Instrument panel.

The lorry models featured the first solid steel structured cabin type designed and produced by SAT. The cabin was also available extended, with another passenger seat in the back. The short cabin enabled maximum platform length of 3 450 mm.

The standard cabin includes seats for driver and one passenger. The interior is hardly upholstered; the earliest versions lacked of cover even on the ceiling. The side windows are openable by sliding front half on rails. The dashboard is equipped with a speedometer including odometer and a combination gauge that shows fuel level and engine temperature, and includes also charging and oil pressure indicator lights. The engine starter is operated by a separate button on dashboard. The heater nozzles are directed to the windscreen and legroom. The windscreen washing device works by squeezing a plastic bottle filled with washing fluid. The driver's seat is adjustable by rails.

The electric system is 12-volt type and produced by Lucas. The 84-Ah battery is located under passenger seat. The generator is either Lucas C45 (288 W) or Delco-Remy (300 W).

The lorry models were available with a hydraulic tipper. The telescopic cylinder is located between the cabin and tipper and used by a multi-piston pump, operated by PTO on gearbox.

Other than lorries, typical applications are buses, fire engines and mobile shops; the bodies were built by independent coachbuilders, such as Lahden Autokori and Kiitokori, or Karia, which was a subsidiary of SAT.

=== Dimensions and weights ===
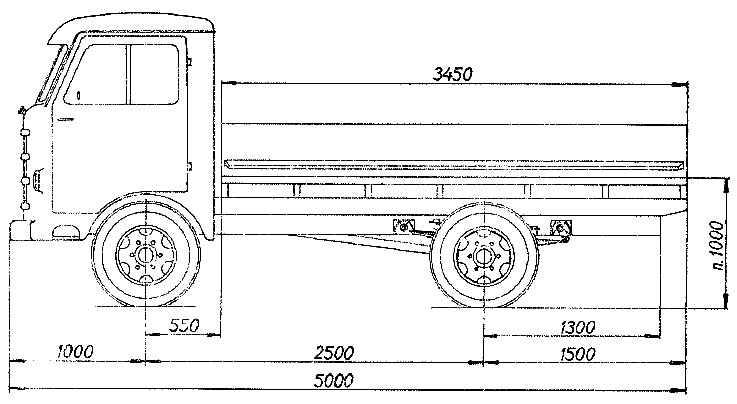
Measurements of Sisu KB-24SA with 2 500 mm wheelbase.

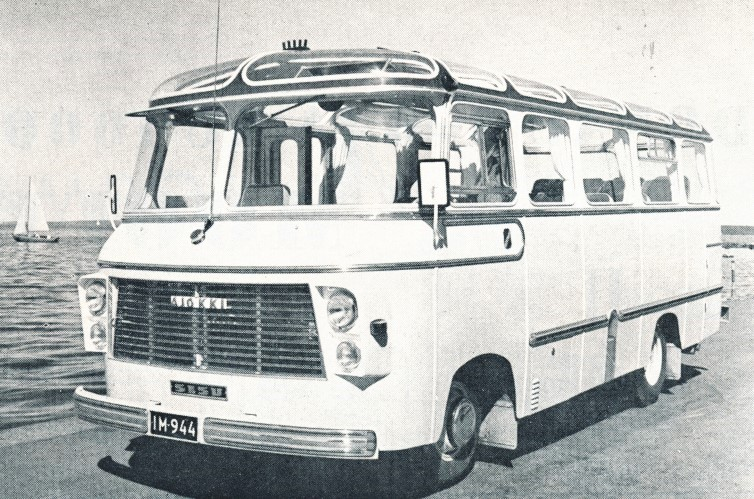
Sisu KB-24 sightseeing bus with 3 200 mm wheelbase.

Wheelbase, lorry models	2,500 mm (98.4 in)	3,200 mm (126.0 in)	4,000 mm (157.5 in)
Dimensions
Platform maximum outer length	3,450 mm (135.8 in)	4,600 mm (181.1 in)	6,000 mm (236.2 in)
Rear overhang	1,500 mm (59.1 in)	1,950 mm (76.8 in)	2,550 mm (100.4 in)
Total length	5,100 mm (200.8 in)	6,250 mm (246.1 in)	7,650 mm (301.2 in)
Vehicle width	1,950 mm (76.8 in)		
Track, front	1,565 mm (61.6 in)		
Track, rear	1,500 mm (59.1 in)		
Platform height, unladen	1,000 mm (39.4 in)		
Turning radius, measured from outer front wheel	5,000 mm (196.9 in)	6,900 mm (271.7 in)	6,300 mm (248.0 in)
Weights
Max. permitted load on public roads	6,000 kg (13,227.7 lb)		
Rear axle weight	4,000 kg (8,818.5 lb)		
Front axle weight	2,000 kg (4,409.2 lb)		
Chassis kerb weight	2,200 kg (4,850.2 lb)	2,425 kg (5,346.2 lb)	2,550 kg (5,621.8 lb)
Capacity including platform	3,800 kg (8,377.6 lb)	3,575 kg (7,881.5 lb)	3,450 kg (7,605.9 lb)

== Use and characteristics ==
Never think, that Nalle-Sisu is a Ferrari and You are Fangio; instead, let the drivers with faster vehicles to pass You when ever they desire.

— Nalle-Sisu KB-24SA/ Instructions and periodic maintenance, 1959,

Due to the large 50° turning angle of inner front wheel and small measurements Nalle-Sisu became a common delivery lorry. The low, about one-metre high platform eased handling of heavy goods. Typical Nalle-Sisu users were the State Railways, Finnish Post, City of Helsinki Sanitation Service, Helsinki City Gas Works and number of coal and firewood distributors.

The nominal fuel consumption is 11–13 litres /100 km and the top speed reaches 74 km/h, which is practically over the area of decent driving characteristics.

== Sources ==
- Mäkipirtti, Markku (2011). Sisu. Ajoneuvot Suomessa (in Finnish). Vol. 4 (2. ed.). Tampere: Apali Oy. ISBN 978-952-5877-05-2.
- Blomberg, Olli (2006). Suomalaista Sisua vuodesta 1931 – Monialaosaajasta kuorma-autotehtaaksi [Finnish Sisu since 1931 – From multi-industrial expert to lorry factory] (in Finnish). Karis: Oy Sisu Auto Ab. ISBN 952-91-4918-2.
- "Nalle-Sisu KB-24SA/ Käyttöohjeet ja määräaikaishuolto" [Nalle-Sisu KB-24SA/ Instructions and periodic maintenance]. User's Manual (47/159). Oy Suomen Autoteollisuus Ab. 1959.
