= Nalle Knutsson =

Swedish actor (1943–2012)

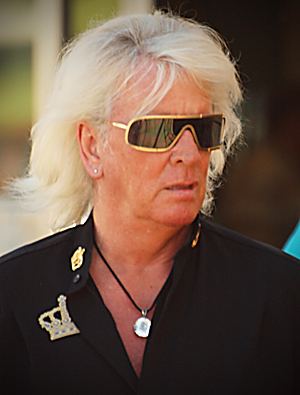
- Knutsson in 2011
- Born: Kjell Knut Ove Knutsson; 19 February 1943
- Died: 11 June 2012 (aged 69)
- Occupation(s): Actor, designer

Kjell Knut Ove "Nalle" Knutsson (19 February 1943 – 11 June 2012) was a Swedish musical artist, actor, party planner, clothing designer, and television and entertainment personality.

== Career ==
Knutsson had several roles in musical in the 1960s among them in West Side Story, and in 1967 he acted in the film Picknick på slagfältet. After that he made efforts to launch an international singing and acting career, he performed at casinos around the world among them being Casino de Libanon in Beirut, Sun City Hall in South Africa and Dunes in Las Vegas.

In 1974, Knutsson participated in the Git Gay Show in Stockholm, a bar show, he claims to have sewn gas stage clothing.

In the 1990s, Nalle Knutsson took part in different shows on ZTV with Peter Siepen, in 1996 he was interviewed in Siepens program Estrad. Knutsson re-appeared for the large audience in the 2000 reality series Nalles Show which was broadcast on Kanal 5. In the show Knutsson and his show group was made to put on a show and tour around Sweden. The show had its premiere on Östersund in front of the audience 600 people. After that the ensemble did a performance at the bar Tiger in Stockholm.

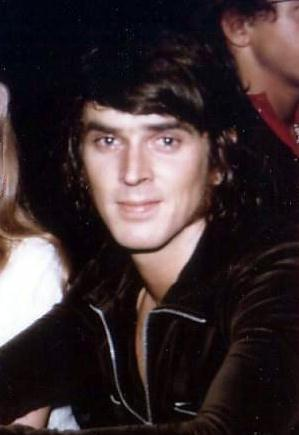
Knutsson in Stockholm in July 1971.

Knutsson took part in the 2005 TV3 reality series Club Goa which was filmed at Baga Beach, Goa, India and featured several of Sweden's best known reality series personalities. In 2006, he did a guest appearance in Big Brother on Kanal 5 where he was a teacher in etiquette and manners with the housemates.

Knutssons last acting role was in episode 10 of the 2013 TV series Allt faller, which was broadcast on TV4 eight months after his death.

== Personal life ==
In the summer of 2005, after participating in Club Goa, Knutsson applied for adoption of the then 30-year-old Indian hairdresser Sanjay Komar, whose family he had helped with costs for their home and economic help. The same year, he invited Komar to Stockholm to try to help him get a residence permit in Sweden and a place of work. The adoption was not granted and Komar returned to India.

Knutsson died 2012 from liver cancer. He is buried at Skogskyrkogården in Stockholm.

He has also worked as a library assistance in Stockholm. He lived in Enskededalen, he had two sons.
