= Tero Saarinen Company =

Finnish dance group founded in 1996

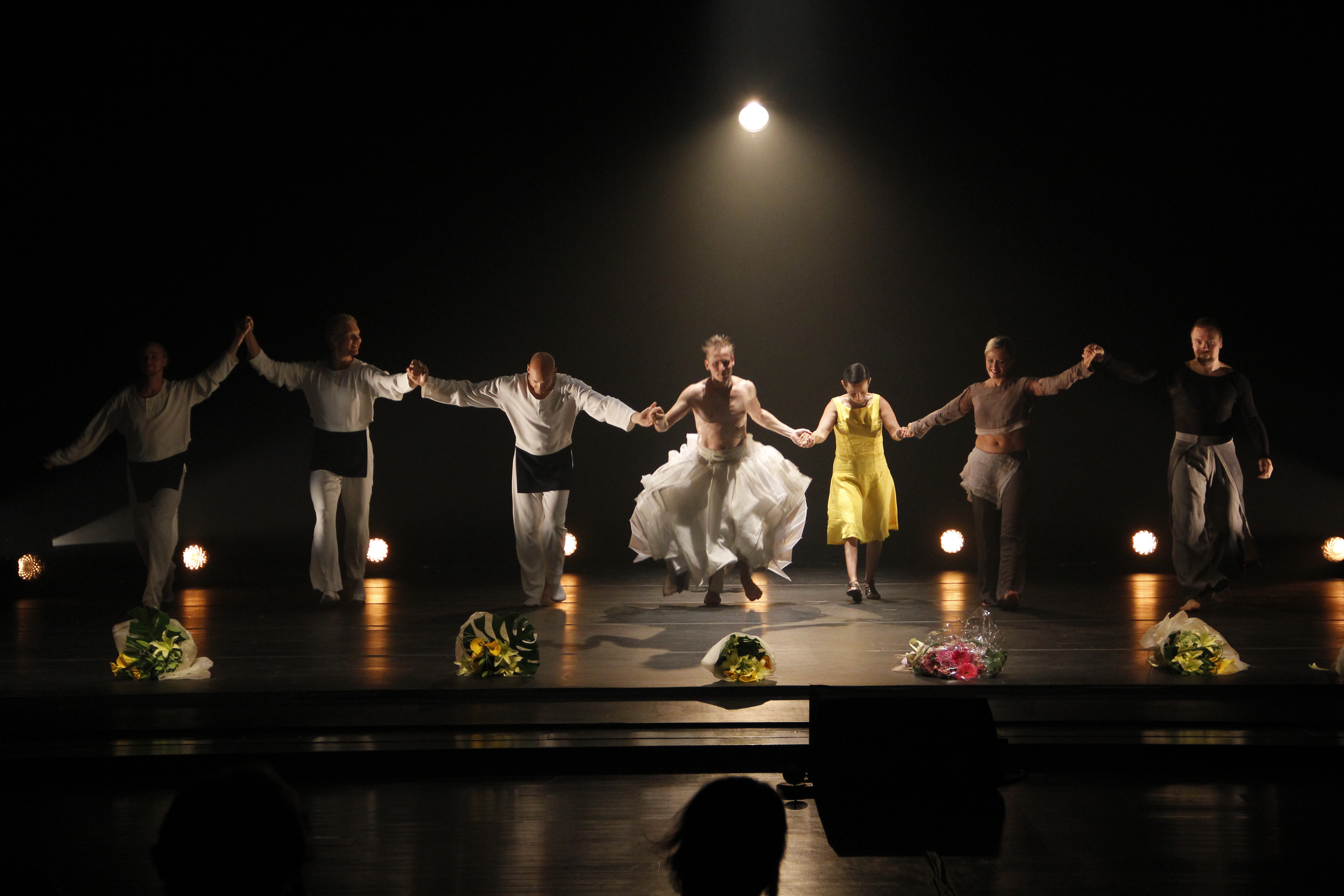
- Tero Saarinen Company at Bard SummerScape in July 2011, The Fisher Center in New York, USA
- Formation: February 18, 1996
- Type: Theatre group
- Purpose: Contemporary dance
- Location: Helsinki, Finland
- Artistic director: Tero Saarinen
- Website: terosaarinen.com/en/

Tero Saarinen Company is a dance group led by Finnish dance artist and choreographer Tero Saarinen, which he founded in 1996. In Helsinki the group is the programme partner of Dance House Helsinki, where the company presents Tero Saarinen's works along with pieces by guest choreographers and produces international guest performances. The company's activities also include the teaching of Tero Technique both in Finland and internationally and a residency program at TSC Studio, located at the Cable Factory in Helsinki.

Tero Saarinen Company is considered one of Finland's leading cultural exports. The group has performed in 40 countries. The company's pieces and Saarinen's choreographies have been a part of the repertoire of other leading dance companies around the world. The group follows the network-centric organization model, and employs about 80–120 people each year, 17 of whom have permanent posts.

The company's own works are created as international co-productions and are known for their multidisciplinarity. The company's distinctive movement language is based in a movement technique developed by Saarinen, called Tero Technique, which blends influences from Western and Asian dance traditions and from classical and contemporary influences.

== History ==
Tero Saarinen, an international soloist, assembled the dance group Company Toothpick in 1995 as an instrument for expressing his own choreographic vision. Saarinen wanted to work on a more permanent basis with inspired artists who shared his values. The group's founding members, alongside Saarinen, were his colleague Henrikki Heikkilä from the Finnish National Ballet, Yuval Pick from Batsheva Dance Company, and Lighting Designer Mikki Kunttu. Company Toothpick was given a humorous name to commemorate the matchstick factory in Pori, where Saarinen was born.

The group's first piece, Westward Ho! premiered in Stockholm's Dansens Hus on 18 February 1996. In 1997 the group was invited to perform the piece at the first Aerowaves platform held at The Place Theatre in London. The performance marked Saarinen's international breakthrough as a choreographer, and the group began receiving invitations from all over Europe.

In 2000 Company Toothpick acquired office space in The Alexander Theatre. In 2001 the group took on its first full-time employee, when its current Managing Director Iiris Autio began working as Saarinen's manager and the group's producer. In 2002 the group changed its name to Tero Saarinen Company, and in 2004 it became eligible for regular state subsidy under the Finnish Theatre and Orchestra Act, and began receiving operational funding from both the Finnish State and the City of Helsinki.

The Alexander Theatre in Helsinki has been the company's home since 1999–2019. Tero Saarinen Company was the Alexander Theatre's official resident company since 2005. In addition to regular performances, the theatre housed the group's office and rehearsal space – the same studio where Tero Saarinen started his professional career in 1982, when the building was still the home of the Finnish National Ballet. In addition to the Alexander Theatre, the company also performed at The Finnish National Opera and Finnish National Theatre. Since 2019 the company's office and studio are located at the Cable Factory in Helsinki.

== Performances ==
=== Operations in Helsinki ===
In Helsinki Tero Saarinen Company TSC's home stage is Dance House Helsinki, where the company presents its own seasons yearly. These include pieces by Tero Saarinen, by guest choreographers and guest performances by international companies. In addition to performances, the group's activities in Helsinki include teaching and community outreach projects.

=== Touring ===
Tero Saarinen Company toured in 40 countries on all continents. The group has performed in venues and at events including: Maison de la danse in Lyon; Théâtre du Châtelet and Théâtre National de Chaillot in Paris; the Movimentos festival in Wolfsburg; Tanz im August in Berlin; Kampnagel in Hamburg; The Joyce Theater; New York City Center; and BAM (Brooklyn Academy of Music; Howard Gilman Opera House) in New York; Jacob's Pillow Dance Festival in Becket, Massachusetts; Walt Disney Concert Hall in Los Angeles; Southbank Centre in London; Chekhov International Theatre Festival in Moscow; Alexandrinsky Theatre in Saint Petersburg; The Ibero-American Theater Festival in Bogota; Festival Internacional de Buenos Aires in Argentina; SIDance in Seoul; Perth International Arts Festival in Perth, Australia; and New Zealand International Arts Festival in Wellington.

Most of the group's works are produced as international co-productions. Co-producers include: The Joyce Theatre (USA); Automne en Normandie (France); Maison de la danse (France); Venice Biennale (Italy); Southbank Centre (UK); Dansens Hus (Sweden); and Kuopio Dance Festival (Finland).

=== Premieres ===
Saarinen has produced 46 original works altogether, 17 of them for his own group. (April 2018)

Tero Saarinen Company has staged a total of 17 original works by Saarinen, and has also incorporated into its repertoire some of Saarinen's other works, along with solo pieces given to Saarinen by Carolyn Carlson. Tero Saarinen Company's key works include: the company's breakthrough opus Westward Ho! (1996); Saarinen's Stravinsky works Petrushka (2001) and HUNT (2002); the Shaker inspired Borrowed Light (2004), "Morphed" (2014) set to the music of Esa-Pekka Salonen and "Kullervo", a large-scale co-production with The Finnish National Opera and Ballet featuring the music of Jean Sibelius.

The solo piece HUNT (2002), a collaboration with Multimedia Artist Marita Liulia, has attracted exceptional international attention. By the end of 2013 Saarinen will have performed this piece 174 times in 82 cities and 32 countries, in Asia, Africa, South and North America, and Europe, and it has been dubbed one of the most significant choreographies made for Stravinsky's The Rite of Spring. Tero Saarinen ceased performing the piece in 2013, after the centennial of The Rite. Borrowed Light, performed at dozens of leading venues in Europe, Oceania and North America since its creation in 2004, has also attracted critical acclaim in the international media. For instance, The Village Voice in the USA listed it as one of The Decade's Best Dance Performances.

Original work	Premiere	Performing group	Artistic team	Production
Westward Ho!	1996-02-18, Dansens Hus, Stockholm, Sweden	Tero Saarinen Company Also in repertoires: Introdans (2000, Department of Dance, Theatre Academy (2000), Nünberg Ballet(2002)	Lighting design: Mikki Kunttu Costume design: Tero Saarinen; Music: Collage	Tero Saarinen Company
Overdosed Mood	1997-06-30 Kuopio Dance Festival, Kuopio, Finland	Tero Saarinen Company	Lighting design: Mikki Kunttu Costume Design: Keren Nissim; Music: Collage	Tero Saarinen Company
Un/Do	1998-05-14, Susan Dellal Center, Tel-Aviv, Israel	Batsheva Dance Company Also in repertoires: Tero Saarinen Company (1998), Ballet Gulbenkian (1999)	Lighting design: Mikki Kunttu Costume design: Tero Saarinen; Music: Collage	Batsheva Dance Company
Could you take some of my weight..?	1999-05-28 Théâtre de Saint-Quentin-en Yvelines, Paris, France	Tero Saarinen Company. Also in repertoire: Ballet de Lorraine (2004), NorrDans (2008)	Lighting design: Mikki Kunttu Costume design: Rachel Quarmby; Music: Collage	Tero Saarinen Company
Kaze	2001-06-22 The Venice Biennale, Venice, Italy	Tero Saarinen Company and Yas-Kaz Unit	Music: Yas-Kaz Lighting design: Mikki Kunttu Sound design: Jukka Cavén Costume design: Rachel Quarmby	Tero Saarinen Company in co-production with the Venice Biennale
Petrushka	2001-06-03 Queen Elisabeth Hall, London, Great Britain	Tero Saarinen Company	Music: Igor Stravinsky, Petrushka Lighting design: Mikki Kunttu Costume Design: Erika Turunen Arrangement and performance of music James Crabb and Geir Draugsvoll Sound design: Jukka Kavén	Tero Saarinen Company
Hunt	2002-06-02 The Venice Biennale, Venice, Italy	Tero Saarinen Company	Music: Igor Stravinsky, The Rite of Spring Multimedia: Marita Liulia; Lighting design: Mikki Kunttu Costume design: Erika Turunen; Multimedia programming: Jakke Kastelli	Tero Saarinen Company and La Biennale di Venezia in co-operation with Octobre en Normandie
Borrowed Light	2004-10-08 Octobre en Normandie Festival, Le Havre, France	Tero Saarinen Company and The Boston Camerata	Arrangement of the original Shaker music: Joel Cohen Leading of music: Anne Azéma; Lighting and set design: Mikki Kunttu Costume design: Erika Turunen; Sound design: Heikki Iso-Ahola	Tero Saarinen Company in co-operation with: Octobre en Normandie (France), Dansens Hus (Sweden), Kuopio Dance Festival (Finland), Festival Civitanova Danza (Italy), le Volcan – Scène Nationale du Havre (France), Teatri di Civitanova (Italy), Atelier 231 – Pôle régionale des Arts de la rue (France)
Next of Kin	2008-05-09 Lithuanian National Drama Theatre, Vilnius, Lithuania	Tero Saarinen Company	Music: Jarmo Saari Lighting design: Mikki Kunttu Costume design: Erika Turunen; Sound design: Heikki Iso-Ahola	Tero Saarine Company. Co-producers: Biennale de Lyon (France), the Joyce Theater (US), Alexander Theatre (Finland), Southbank Centre (UK), Helsinki Festival and Lithuanian Dance Information Center in co-operation with Vilnius European Capital of Culture 2009- Organization (Lithuania)
Vox Balaneae	2011-11-05 Automne en Normandie, Le Rive Gauche, Saint-Etienne-du-Rouvray, France	Tero Saarinen Company and Ensemble InterContemporain or Avanti!	Music: George Crumb: Vox Balaenae Lighting and set design: Mikki Kunttu Costume design: Erika Turunen; Sound design:Marco Melchior	Tero Saarinen Company in co-operation with Arts 276/Automne en Normandie (France) and Red Brick Project/CNN Roubaix Nord – Pas de Calaisin – Carolyn Carlson (France)
Absent Presence	2011-11-23, Alexander Theatre, Helsinki, Finland	Tero Saarinen Company	Lighting design: Mikki Kunttu Costume design: Erika Turunen; Music: Jarmo Saari – Jarmo Saari solu	Tero Saarinen Company in co-operation with Alexander Theatre
MESH	2014–2–2, Saitama Arts Theater, Tokyo, Japan	Saitama Dance Association in co-operation with Saitama Arts Theater	Lighting design: Iwashina Takeaki Costume design: Izumi Miyamura; Music: collage	Saitama Dance Association, Tero Saarinen Company
Morphed	2014-08-16, Finnish National Opera, Helsinki Week, Helsinki, Finland	Tero Saarinen Company	Lighting design: Mikki Kunttu Costume design: Teemu Muurimäki Music: Esa-Pekka Salonen	Tero Saarinen Company in co-operation with Helsinki Festival and Opéra Théàtre de Saint-Ètienne
Kullervo	2015–2–13, Finnish National Opera, Helsinki, Suomi	Finnish National Opera and Ballet and Tero Saarinen Company	Lighting design: Mikki Kunttu Costume design: Erika Turunen; Music: Jean Sibelius: Kullervo (Symphony Op. 7)	Tero Saarinen Company in co-operation with Finnish National Opera
TRAIL	2015-12-12, Kenya National Theatre, Nairobi, Kenya	Ghetto Exposed	Lighting design: Ville Konttinen Music: collage	Tero Saarinen Company in co-operation with Ghetto Exposed
Loopit	2017–2–4, Hällä Stage, Tampere, Finland	Dance Theatre MD	Lighting design: Ville Konttinen Costume design: Erika Turunen; Music: collage (The Tiger Lillies)	Dance Theatre MD in co-operation with Tero Saarinen Company
Zimmermann Trio	2018–1–19, Walt Disney Concert Hall, Los Angeles, USA	Tero Saarinen Company and Los Angeles Philharmonic	Lighting and set design: Mikki Kunttu Costume design, Element construction: Erika Turunen; Music: Bernd Alois Zimmermann: Cello Concerto en forme de pas de trois(1966)	LA Phil in co-operation with Tero Saarinen Company
Breath	2018–4–12, Grand Théâtre de Québec, Quebec City, Canada	Tero Saarinen Company and Kimmo Pohjonen	Lighting and set design: Mikki Kunttu Costume design: Teemu Muurimäki; Music: Kimmo Pohjonen	Tero Saarinen Company in co-operation with Tampere hall and Alexander Theatre
Third Practice	2019–5–29, Teatro Amilcare Ponchielli, Rassegna di Danza & Festival Monteverdi, Cremona, Italy	Tero Saarinen Company and Helsinki Baroque Orchestra	Music: Claudio Monteverdi Music direction, Arrangement: Aapo Häkkinen; Lighting and set design: Eero Auvinen (TTT-Theatre); Projection design Thomas Freundlich; Costume design: Erika Turunen; Sound design: Marco Melchior	Tero Saarinen Company Supported by Jane & Aatos Erkko Foundation (Finland) In collaboration with Fondazione Teatro Amilcare Ponchielli (Italy); With thanks to Rassegna di Danza & Festival Monteverdi (Fondazione Teatro A. Ponchielli, Cremona, Italy), ATER – Associazione Teatrale Emilia Romagna (Italy), Kuopio Dance Festival (Finland), Stoa (Finland), the Finnish National Theatre and TTT-Theatre (Finland)

== Teaching programme ==
Ever since its foundation, Tero Saarinen Company's operations have included an international teaching programme. Nowadays courses and workshops for professional dancers and advanced level dance students are held all over the world, approximately four to five times a year.

Tero Saarinen's movement language is based on the movement technique that he developed himself, drawing influences from Butoh, ballet, Western modern dance, as well as martial arts. One prominent feature of his mode of expression is the use of the eyes and hands, which are important in Asian dance traditions. His style has been described as an organic and innovative mixture of beauty and the grotesque.

The teaching of the technique for Saarinen's movement language concentrates on awakening the dancer's senses and general alertness, as well as activating their nerve endings, and acknowledging and using the body's own weight. The aim is to maximize the dancers’ capacity to use balance and off balance. The pedagogy focuses on internalizing the movement and the dancer's personal interpretation, aided by mental visualization techniques. Alongside Saarinen, the Head of Artistic Development Sini Länsivuori is in charge of developing the company's teaching operations.

== Operations ==
=== Organization ===
The company functions as a network organization and has 17 permanent employees. In addition, each year some 40 to 80 professionals from different fields and various parts of the world also work with the group on specific productions or out-of-house service contracts. Tero Saarinen Company uses shared leadership; the management is divided up so that Tero Saarinen is in charge of the artistic content and Managing Director Iiris Autio is in charge of production, managing and finances. The group is supported by a registered non-profit association, a host organization called Into liikkeessä (Passion in Motion).

The primary aim of Tero Saarinen Company has been defined as to "promote a humane worldview and basic human values through the language of dance, while also increasing people’s understanding of their own physicality and its significance for a good life."

The group's artistic aim is to use choreography, music and visual design to give people profound experiences in the form of enduring, total artworks – open, interactive situations that allow audience members to address fundamental human questions. The group's basic values are: a sense of community, openness, uncompromising quality, and an appreciation of hard work and entrepreneurship.

=== Funding ===
In 2004 Tero Saarinen Company became eligible for regular state subsidy under the Finnish Theatre and Orchestra Act. Between 2006 and 2016, State subsidies accounted for an average of 35 per cent, and operating subsidies from the City of Helsinki about 7 per cent of the group's entire budget.

=== Dancers ===
Tero Saarinen Company has always employed strong, expressive dancers. In its early stages, these included Saarinen's colleagues from the Finnish National Ballet, such as Henrikki Heikkilä, Sini Länsivuori, Anu Sistonen and Heikki Vienola – the majority of whom are still working with the company.

=== Artistic collaborators ===
Tero Saarinen Company's works can be defined as comprehensive artworks: in addition to the choreography and interpretation, both music and visual presentation are important components in Saarinen's works. Among Saarinen's trusted collaborators are lighting designer Mikki Kunttu and costume designer Erika Turunen. Saarinen makes use of live music in many of his works. His musical collaborators include The Boston Camerata, Ensemble InterContemporain, the accordion duo James Crabb and Geir Draugsvoll, the chamber orchestra Avanti!, composer-musician Jarmo Saari and Finnish accordionist Kimmo Pohjonen. Saarinen has created numerous works for other dance groups. The Dutch Nederlands Dans Theater (NDT1), the French ballets of Lyon, Marseille and Lorraine, the Portuguese Ballet Gulbekian, the Israeli Batsheva Dance Company, the Swedish Gothenburg opera Ballet, and the Finnish National Ballet, and others, have featured Saarinen's works in their repertoires.
