= Mikki Kunttu =

Finnish lighting and set designer (born 1971)

Mikki Kunttu (born 1971) is a Finnish lighting and set designer. Kunttu has worked mainly in the field of dance, but also theatre, popular music and opera, as well as television and industrial arts. At the age of 18 Kunttu began designing lightings for Kotka City Theatre. He graduated in 1995 from the Media and Arts programme of Tampere University of Applied Sciences, specializing in lighting and sound design. After graduating he proceeded to work at Tampere Concert Hall.

Kunttu has worked with many prominent dance artists and groups from Finland and abroad, such as Tero Saarinen, Jorma Elo, Jorma Uotinen, Carolyn Carlson, Akram Khan, Jirí Kylián and Sidi Larbi Cherkaoui. Kunttu has collaborated repeatedly with the Finnish National Opera and Ballet, Norwegian National Ballet, Royal Danish Ballet and The Boston Ballet.

Mikki Kunttu is one of the founding members of Tero Saarinen Company and has created the lightning designs and visualization for all Company productions. In 2006 Kunttu received the prestigious Bessie Award in New York City for lighting design for Tero Saarinen Company and Akram Khan Company.

His handprint can also be seen in Finnish television. He has worked as a lighting, screen and set designer in several large productions, including various TV galas such as Savonlinna Opera Festival, the Finnish adaptations of Talent, Idols, Dancing with the Stars, Dance Suomi, Big Brother, and Clash of the Choirs, as well as the Life for Children Charity Concerts, the MTV3 Semi-centennial Gala and the Eurovision Song Contests in Helsinki in 2007, Malmö in 2013 and Stockholm in 2016.

Kunttu's visual design has also been seen on tours and concerts by Kimmo Pohjonen, Apocalyptica, Paula Koivuniemi, Hanoi Rocks, Ismo Alanko, Von Hertzen Brothers and Michael Monroe.

His latest projects include the lighting design for the Grand Opening of the new Oslo Opera House (2008), the Season of Light event and Armo - Grace Installation for Lux Helsinki (2009–2011) and Scalada: Stelar by Cirque du Soleil (2017).

== Prizes and Grants ==
- Five-year grant of the Arts Council of Finland (2005)
- Bessie Award (USA 2006)
- Koura Award (2007)
- Säde Award (2007)
- Venla Diploma of Merit (2010)
