= Tero Saarinen =

Finnish dancer and choreographer (born 1964)

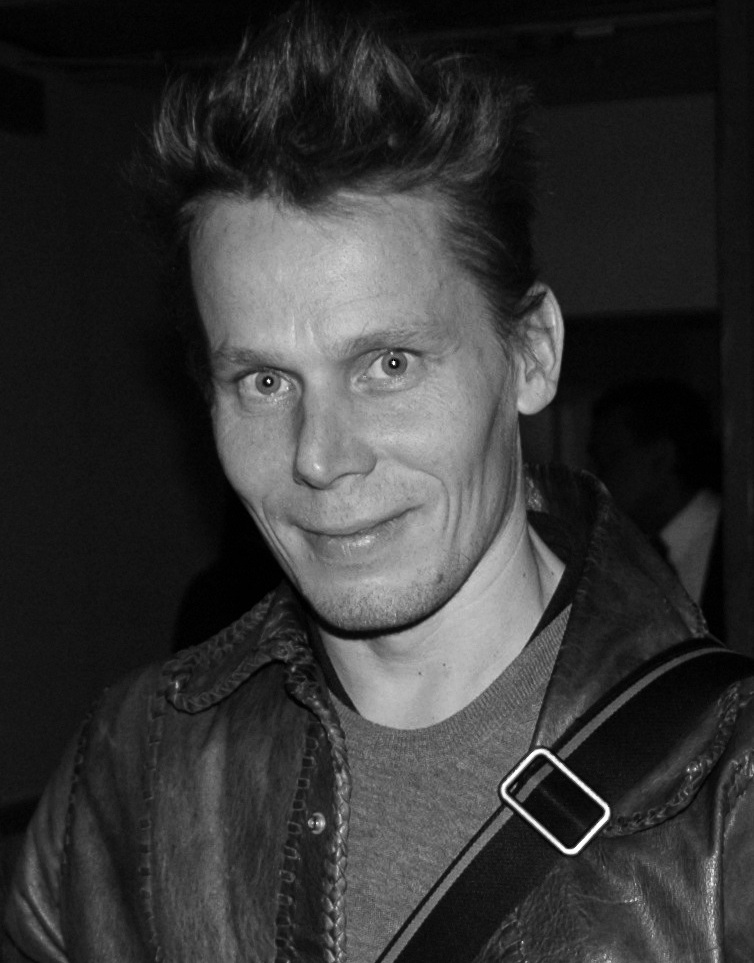
Tero Saarinen, 2010

Tero Kalevi Saarinen (born September 7, 1964, in Pori, Finland) is a Finnish dance artist and choreographer, and Artistic Director of Tero Saarinen Company. Saarinen has made an international career as both a dancer and choreographer.

As a choreographer Saarinen is known for his unique movement language that plays with balance and off-balance, combining influences from Butoh and martial arts to classical ballet and Western contemporary dance. Saarinen's movement language has been described as “organic” and “inventive”, “like Butoh with wings.”

He began his career at the Finnish National Ballet in 1985. His long international career as a soloist took off in 1988, after he won first prize at the Concours International de Danse de Paris.

Saarinen left the Finnish National Ballet in 1992 to seek new influences in Western Europe and Japan, where he studied traditional Japanese dance and Butoh from 1992 to 1993.

Saarinen founded his own group, Tero Saarinen Company, in 1996. By April 2018, he has created 46 original works, many of them for other dance groups. Nederlands Dans Theater, the French ballets of Lyon, Marseille and Lorraine, the Portuguese Ballet Gulbenkian, the Israeli Batsheva Dance Company, the Swedish Gothenburg Opera ballet, the Finnish National Ballet, and others, have featured Saarinen's works in their repertoires.

Saarinen has received numerous acknowledgements for his work as an artist. In 2001 he was awarded the Finland Prize, and in 2005 the Pro Finlandia medal. In 2008 The Finnish Cultural Foundation gave him an award for his achievements as an artist. International recognition includes the international Movimientos Dance Prize for Best Male Performer, and the title of Chevalier de l’Ordre des Arts et des Lettres, granted by the French government, both in 2004.

== Career ==
=== Early years ===
As a child Tero Saarinen was always involved in one hobby or another, at different times he played ice hockey or football, cross-country skied or trained in gymnastics. In middle school he became inspired by the visual arts, and his other hobbies had to give way, until a dance school opened in Pori and Saarinen's father encouraged him to take up jazz dance. This interest in visual arts can still be seen in Saarinen's choreographies: he has said he sees the stage as his canvas.

Saarinen was 16 when he started taking dance classes in Pori. He soon developed a passion for dance, and his dance teacher Liisa Nojonen sent Saarinen to Helsinki to take the entrance exam for the Finnish National Opera Ballet School. Saarinen was accepted for the ballet school in 1982, at the age of 17. He had practised dance for a little over a year when he started at the school, while the other students were only 12 years old.

=== Career beginnings in Finland ===
Saarinen studied at the National Opera Ballet School from 1982 to 1986. In 1985 he was taken on as a dancer at the National Ballet. He was soon given soloist's roles and became one of the National Ballet's audience favourites, alongside Tommi Kitti.

In 1988 Saarinen won first prize in the contemporary category at Concours International de Danse in Paris with Jorma Uotinen's choreography B12. After his victory in this prestigious competition, his career began to soar both in Finland and internationally.

Saarinen started creating his own choreographies, and began receiving invitations to appear in productions outside of the National Ballet. He was a visiting soloist with the Helsinki City Theatre's dance group in 1989-1991.

Saarinen's first choreography was a Japan-inspired solo choreography Ondekoza (1989). This was followed by another solo piece Kehtolaulu (1990), which addressed personal concerns; the hardships of taking responsibility, and growing pains. Saarinen's first opportunity to make a group piece came when his former dance teacher Liisa Nojonen asked him to create a work for her company. They then gave the result, More Milk, its premiere in 1991.

=== The start of an international career ===
After his competition victory in Paris, Saarinen toured the world as a soloist. Alongside Jorma Uotinen's solo piece B12 Saarinen got to interpret Déjà Vu, a solo piece by Murray Louis, which had previously only been permitted to be danced by the choreographer himself and Rudolf Nureyev.

With success, Saarinen found it increasingly hard to settle for the male roles and opportunities as a dancer offered by classical ballet. His breakaway came with the solo piece Takana (1992), a declaration of new beginnings and of leaving the past behind. This process first led to Saarinen taking a year off, and eventually resigning from his tenured post at the National Ballet in 1993.

At first Saarinen journeyed to Nepal for two months, where he travelled and studied Nepalese dance at the Kala-Mandapa Institute in Kathmandu, under the instruction of Rajendra Shestra. In the fall of 1992 his interest in the minimalistic expression of Japanese arts took him to Tokyo, Japan, to study various dance genres. Saarinen studied traditional Japanese Kabuki theatre at the famous Fujima School of Tokyo, specializing in onnagata (female) roles. Kabuki schools do not usually accept foreign students, but Saarinen got special permission from his teacher Yoko Fujima after giving him a sample display of his abilities. Saarinen studied Butoh dance – a dance form born in Japan after World War Two and originating in the sub-conscious – under the guidance of the great Japanese Butoh artist Kazuo Ohno in his house in Yokohama. While in Japan, Saarinen also trained in aikido.

In addition to Kazuo Ohno and other influences from Asia, Saarinen often mentions Carolyn Carlson, Tommi Kitti, Marjo Kuusela and Jorma Uotinen as important artistic role models.

=== Years as a freelancer ===
Upon his return to Finland from Asia in 1993, Saarinen started working as a freelancer. Most of his time was spent on tours with various dance groups in Germany, Italy, the US, and elsewhere, as part of Daniel Ezralow's group and, together with Ismael Ivo and Mara Borba, in the triumphant production of Francis Bacon directed by Johann Kresnik.

Saarinen performed as a freelance dancer in designer Issey Miyake's fashion shows in Paris in 1993-1995. He was a visiting soloist with Teatro Comunale di Firenze in its production of Aida in 1994. The conductor was Zubin Mehta, and the production toured Italy and Japan.

During his time as a freelancer Saarinen created choreographies for several dance groups. His first choreography after returning from Asia was Vajonneet, premiered at the Finnish National Opera on 6 May 1993. Hurmaa 1, created for the Tampere-based dance theatre MD Mobita Dansco in the fall of 1993, launched his still ongoing close cooperation with lighting designer Mikki Kunttu. Wanha, which Saarinen created for himself and Kenneth Kvarnström, received its premiered as a licensed work for the 1994 Kuopio Dance Festival. Saarinen also created Lifewheel (1994) for PDC, as well as Lelulaatikko (1995) for Tampere Hall and Sirkus Bohemia (1995) for the Kuopio Dance Festival.

Wanha started Saarinen on the road to a career as an internationally acclaimed choreographer. After seeing it, Ohad Naharin, the director of Batsheva Dance Company, commissioned a work for his Israel-based group. Saarinen's choreography Flock premiered in Tel Aviv in late December 1994.

=== Tero Saarinen Company ===
Saarinen wanted to work on a more permanent basis with inspired artists who shared his values. In the fall of 1995 he assembled his own dance group, called Tero Saarinen & Company Toothpick. Alongside Saarinen, the founding members were his colleagues Henrikki Heikkilä from the Finnish National Ballet, Yuval Pick from the Batsheva Dance Company in Israel, and lighting designer Mikki Kunttu. Company Toothpick was jokingly named in memory of the matchstick factory in Pori, where Saarinen was born.

The group's first piece, Westward Ho! premiered at Stockholm's Dansens Hus on 18 February 1996. In 1997 an invitation was received to perform piece at the first Aerowaves platform held in The Place Theatre in London. The performance was to be Saarinen's international breakthrough as a choreographer, and the group began receiving invitations from all over Europe.

In 2000, Company Toothpick acquired an office in the Alexander Theatre in Helsinki. In 2001 the group took on its first full-time employee, when its current Managing Director Iiris Autio began working as Saarinen's manager and the group's producer. In 2002 the group changed its name to Tero Saarinen Company, and in 2004 it became eligible for regular state subsidy under the Finnish Theatre and Orchestra Act, and began receiving operational funding from both the State and the City of Helsinki.

Nowadays Tero Saarinen Company is considered one of Finland's leading cultural exports. The company's own works are created as international co-productions, and include many of Saarinen's best known choreographies. Tero Saarinen's richly original choreographic style is characterized by his distinctive movement language and multidimensional artistry - expressive dancers, live music, and striking visuals. The group has performed in nearly 40 countries, and an international teaching programme has been a part of its operations since its foundation.

Saarinen has produced 46 original works altogether, many of them for other dance groups. The Nederlands Dans Theater (NDT1), the French ballets of Lyon, Marseille and Lorraine, the Portuguese Ballet Gulbenkian, the Israeli Batsheva Dance Company, the Swedish Gothenburg Opera Ballet, Finnish National Ballet and others have featured Saarinen's works in their repertoires.

In addition to choreographing, Saarinen has continued his career as an international soloist. Among his most praised performances is HUNT, a solo that Saarinen had performed 174 times and in 32 countries by the end of 2013. Another of his solo career highlights has been Carolyn Carlson's decision to pass on her famous full length piece Blue Lady to Saarinen. The re-interpretation, Blue Lady (Revisited), first premiered in 2008 at the Biennale de la danse de Lyon, and has been an international success.

== Movement technique ==
Saarinen is known as a poetic interpreter of reality. As a choreographer he has been able to renew the movement language of dance and create a unique vocabulary and style of his own, shifting between beauty and the grotesque. His movement language is based on a movement technique that he developed himself, drawing influences from Butoh, ballet, Western modern dance, as well as martial arts. The use of the eyes and hands, which are an important feature of his mode of expression.

The teaching of the technique for Saarinen's movement language concentrates on awakening the senses in the feet, general alertness and focusing, as well as activating the nerve endings, and acknowledging and using the weight of the body. The aim is to maximize the dancers’ capacity to use balance and off balance. The teaching highlights the internalization of each movement and the dancer's personal interpretation, assisted by mental visualization techniques.

Alongside Saarinen, the Head of Artistic Development Sini Länsivuori is in charge of developing the company's teaching operations.

== Choreographic portfolio ==
=== Best known works ===
Tero Saarinen has choreographed 46 original works, 17 of them for his own group. Tero Saarinen Company's key works include the company's breakthrough piece Westward Ho! (1996), Saarinen's Stravinsky works Petrushka (2001) and HUNT (2002), and the Shaker inspired Borrowed Light (2004), "Morphed" (2014) set to the music of Esa-Pekka Salonen and "Kullervo", a large-scale co-production with The Finnish National Opera and Ballet featuring the music of Jean Sibelius.

The solo piece HUNT (2002), a collaboration with multimedia Artist Marita Liulia, has attracted exceptional international attention. Saarinen performed the piece 174 times in 83 cities and 32 countries, in Asia, Africa, South and North America and Europe, and it has been dubbed one of the most significant choreographies made for Stravinsky's The Rite of Spring. Tero Saarinen ceased performing HUNT in 2013, after the centennial of The Rite of Spring.

Borrowed Light, performed at dozens of leading venues in Europe, Oceania and North America since its creation in 2004, has also attracted significant critical acclaim in the international media. For instance, The Village Voice in the USA listed it as one of The Decade's Best Dance Performances.

Of the choreographies that Saarinen has created for other groups, some of the best known are Gaspard (1996), premiered by the Lyon Opera Ballet, Transfigured Night (2000), commissioned by the Gothenburg ballet, and the large scale work Mariage (2007), commissioned by the ballet of Lorraine and the opera of Nancy, France. This last work, set to Igor Stravinsky's composition Les Noces, reinforced Saarinen's reputation as an important Stravinsky interpreter of our time.

=== Collaborators ===
Saarinen aspires to create total artworks: in addition to the choreography and interpretation, music and visual presentation are important components in his works. Among Saarinen's trusted collaborators are Lighting Designer Mikki Kunttu and costume Designer Erika Turunen.

Saarinen makes use of live music in many of his works. His musical collaborators include The Boston Camerata, Ensemble InterContemporain, the accordionist duo James Crabb and Geir Draugsvoll, the chamber orchestra Avanti!, composer-musician Jarmo Saari and Finnish accordionist Kimmo Pohjonen.

Saarinen has created numerous works for other dance groups. The Dutch Nederlands Dans Theater (NDT1), the French ballets of Lyon, Marseille and Lorraine, the Portuguese Ballet Gulbekian, the Israeli Batsheva Dance Company, the Swedish Gothenburg opera Ballet, the Finnish National Ballet, and others have featured Saarinen's works in their repertoires.

=== Premieres ===
Original Work	Premiere	Performing Group	Artistic Team	Production
Ondekoza	Fall 1989, Mies tanssii-Gala, Savoy Theatre, Helsinki, Finland	Dancer: Tero Saarinen	Costume and lighting design: Tero Saarinen	
Kehtolaulu (Lullaby)	November 1990, Moving in November- Festival, Stoa Theatre, Helsinki, Finland	Dancer: Tero Saarinen	Costume and lighting design: Tero Saarinen Music: Meredith Monk	
More Milk	1991, Pori Theatre, Pori, Finland	P.D.C. Pori Dance Company	Costume and lighting design: Tero Saarinen Music: Collage	P.D.C. Pori Dance Company
Takana (In the Past)	1992-09-09, Savoy Theatre, Helsinki, Finland	Dancer: Tero Saarinen	Costume and lighting design: Tero Saarinen Set design: Susanna Laurola Music: Jan Garbarek	
Vajonneet (The Sunken)	1993-05-06, Finnish National opera, Helsinki, Finland	Finnish National Ballet	Lighting design: Juha Westman Costume and set design: Tero Saarinen Music: Henryk Górecki	Finnish National Opera
Hurmaa 1 (Exuberance 1)	1993-09-03, The Old Customs House, Tampere, Finland	Dance theatre Dansco	Lighting design: Mikki Kunttu Costume and set design: Tero Saarinen Music:Tiensuu, Czukay, trad.	Dance Theatre Dansco
Lifewheel	1994-05-28, Pori theatre, Pori, Finland	P.D.C. Pori Dance Company	Costume and lighting design: Tero Saarinen Music: Hamza El Din	P.D.C. Pori Dance Company
Wanha	1994-06-13, Kuopio Dance Festival, Kuopio, Finland	Dancers: Tero Saarinen and Kenneth Kvarnström	Lighting design. Mikki Kunttu Costume design: Tero Saarinen Music: Henryk Górecki	
Flock	1994-12-22, Susan Dellal Center, Tel-Aviv, Israel	Batsheva Dance Company	Costume design: Tero Saarinen Music: Henryk Górecki	Batsheva Dance Company
Lelulaatikko (Box of toys)	1995-03-03, Tampere Hall, Tampere, Finland	Dancers: Tero Saarinen and Andrea Ladanyi	Music: Debussy, performed by Tampere Filharmonic Orchestra (dir. Tuomas Ollila) Lighting design: Jari Tervakangas Costume design: Tero Saarinen	Tampere Hall and Dance Theatre Mobita/Dansco
Sirkus Bohemia	1995, Kuopio Dance Festival, Kuopio, Finland	Sirkus Bohemia	Music: Mikko-Ville Luolajan-Mikkola Costume and lighting design: Tero Saarinen and Karoliina Heiskanen Set design: Metti Nordin	
Big Flock	1996-01-13, Theatre Academy, Helsinki, Finland	Theatre Academy, Department of Dance	Lighting design: Mikki Kunttu Costume design: Tero Saarinen Music: Henryk Górecki	Theatre Academy, Department of Dance
Westward Ho!	1996-02-18, Dansens Hus, Stockholm, Sweden	Tero Saarinen Company Also in repertoires: Introdans (2000, Department of Dance, Theatre Academy (2000), Nünberg Ballet(2002)	Lighting design. Mikki Kunttu Costume design: Tero Saarinen Music: Collage	Tero Saarinen Company
Daydreampeople	1996-03-18, Finnish National Ballet, Helsinki, Finland	Finnish National Ballet	Lighting design: Olli-Pekka Koivunen Costume design: Tero Saarinen Music: Collage	Finnish National Ballet
Kohta (Passage)	1997-01-18, Helsinki City Theatre, Helsinki, Finland	Helsinki Dance Company	Music: Ali-Zahed Lighting design: Juha Westman Costume design: Tero Saarinen	Helsinki Dance Company
Overdosed Mood	1997-06-30 Kuopio Dance Festival, Kuopio, Finland	Tero Saarinen Company	Lighting design: Mikki Kunttu Costume Design: Keren Nissim Music: Collage	Tero Saarinen Company
Un/Do	1998-05-14, Susan Dellal Center, Tel-Aviv, Israel	Batsheva Dance Company Also in repertoires: Tero Saarinen Company (1998), Ballet Gulbenkian (1999)	Lighting design. Mikki Kunttu Costume design: Tero Saarinen Music: Collage	Batsheva Dance Company
Gaspard	1999-02-12, Lyon Opéra Ballet, Lyon, France	Lyon Opéra Ballet Also in repertoires: Tero Saarinen Company (2003), Göteborgs Operans Ballett (2007)	Music: Maurice Ravel - Gaspard de la Nuit Lighting design: Mikki Kunttu Costume design: Keren Nissim	Lyon Opéra
Could you take some of my weight..?	1999-05-28 Théâtre de Saint-Quentin-en Yvelines, Paris, France	Tero Saarinen Company. Also in repertoires: Ballet de Lorraine (2004), NorrDans (2008)	Lighting design: Mikki Kunttu Costume design: Rachel Quarmby Music: Collage	Tero Saarinen Company
Pulcinella	1999-10-27, Helsinki City Theatre, Helsinki, Finland	Tero Saarinen Company and Helsinki Dance Company	Lighting design. Mikki Kunttu Costume design: Tero Saarinen Music: Collage	Tero Saarinen Company and Helsinki Dance Company
Wavelengths	2000-01-28, Finnish National Opera, Helsinki, Finland	Finnish National Ballet Also in repertoires: Tero Saarinen Company (2004)	Music: Riku Niemi Lighting design: Mikki Kunttu Costume design: Erika Turunen	Finnish National Ballet
Sini	2001-04-17, Lyon Opéra, Lyon, France	Lyon Opéra Ballet	Lighting design: MIkki Kunttu Costume design: Erika Turunen Music: Collage	Lyon Opéra Ballet
Kaze	2001-06-22 The Venice Biennale, Venice, Italy	Tero Saarinen Company and Yas-Kaz Unit	Music: Yas-Kaz Lighting design: Mikki Kunttu Sound design: Jukka Cavén Costume design: Rachel Quarmby	Tero Saarinen Company in co-production with the Venice Biennale
Petrushka	2001-06-03 Queen Elisabeth Hall, London, Great Britain	Tero Saarinen Company	Music: Igor Stravinsky, Petrushka lighting design: Mikki Kunttu Costume Design: Erika Turunen Arrangement and performance of music: James Crabb and Geir Draugsvoll Sound design: Jukka Kavén	Tero Saarinen Company
Even more milk	2002, Pori Theatre, Pori, Finland	P.D.C. Pori Dance Company	Costume and lighting design: Tero Saarinen Music: Collage	P.D.C. Pori Dance Company
Transfigured Night	2002-03-02, Gothenburg Opera, Gothenburg, Sweden	Göteborgs Operans Ballet Also in repertoires: Finnish National Ballet (2005)	Lighting design: Mikki Kunttu Costume design: Rachel Quarmby Music: Arnold Schoenberg	Göteborg Ballet
Hunt	2002-06-02 The Venice Biennale, Venice, Italy	Tero Saarinen Company	Music: igor Stravinsky, The Rite of Spring Multimedia: Marita Liulia Lighting design: Mikki Kunttu Costume design: Erika Turunen Multimedia programming: Jakke Kastelli	Tero Saarinen Company and La Biennale di Venezia in co-operation with Octobre en Normandie
Georgia	2003-03-21, Finnish National Opera, Helsinki, Finland	Finnish National Opera Also in repertoires: Göteborgs Operans Ballet (2007)	Lighting design: Mikki Kunttu Costume design: Erika Turunen Music: Collage	Finnish National Ballet
The Captain	2004-05-22, La Criée, Théâtre National de Marseille, Marseille, France	Ballet National de Marseille	Lighting design: Mikki Kunttu Costume design: Rachel Quarmby Music: Collage	Ballet National de Marseille
Borrowed Light	2004-10-08 Octobre en Normandie Festival, Le Havre, France	Tero Saarinen Company and The Boston Camerata	Arrangement of the original Shaker music: Joel Cohen Music direction: Anne Azéma Lighting and set design: Mikki Kunttu Costume design: Erika Turunen Sound design: Heikki Iso-Ahola	Tero Saarinen Company in co-operation with: Octobre en Normandie (France), Dansens Hus (Sweden), Kuopio Dance Festival (Finland), Festival Civitanova Danza (Italy), le Volcan – Scène Nationale du Havre (France), Teatri di Civitanova (Italy), Atelier 231 – Pôle régionale des Arts de la rue (France)
Huukit	2006-01-18, Theatre Academy, Helsinki, Finland	Theatre Academy Helsinki, Department of Dance	Lighting design: Mikki Kunttu Costume design: Terttu Torkkola Music: Collage	Theatre Academy Helsinki, Department of Dance
Frail Line	2006-03-09, Lucent Danstheater, Haag, Netherlands	Nederland Dans Theater (NDT1)	Lighting and set design: Mikki Kunttu Cotume design. Erika Turunen Music: Collage	Nederlands Dans Theater (NDT 1)
Mariage	2007-12-14, Opéra National de Lorraine, Nancy, France	Ballet de Lorraine and Opéra National de Lorraine Also in repertoires: Finnish National Ballet (2012)	Music: Igor Stravinsky: Les Noces Lighting and set design: Mikki Kunttu Costume design: Erika Turunen	CCN – Ballet de Lorraine and Opéra National de Lorraine
Next of Kin	2008-05-09 Lithuanian National Drama Theatre, Vilnius, Lithuania	Tero Saarinen Company	Music. Jarmo Saari Lighting design: Mikki Kunttu Costume design: Erika Turunen Sound design: Heikki Iso-Ahola	Tero Saarine Company. Co-producers: Biennale de Lyon (France), the Joyce Theater (US), Alexander Theatre (Finland), Southbank Centre (UK), Helsinki Festival and Lithuanian Dance Information Center in co-operation with Vilnius European Capital of Culture 2009- Organization (Lithuania)
Scheme of Things	2009-02-05, Lucent Danstheter, Haag, Netherlands	Nederlands Dans Theater (NDT1) Also in repertoires: Tero Saarinen Company (2011)	Lighting and set design: Mikki Kunttu Costume design: Erika Turunen Music: Collage	Nederlands Dans Theater 1
Double Lives	2010-02-12, Oldenburgisches Staatstheater, Oldenburg, Germany	Nordwest/Tanzocompagnie Oldenburg and Tanztheater Bremen	Lighting design: Ville Konttinen Set design: Ville Konttinen, Tero Saarinen Costume design: Erika Turunen Music: Jarmo Saari Video: Jakke Kastelli, Ville Konttinen, Tero Saarinen	Oldenburgisches Staatstheater and Theater Bremen
Vox Balaenae	2011-11-05 Automne en Normandie, Le Rive Gauche, Saint-Etienne-du-Rouvray, France	Tero Saarinen Company and Ensemble InterContemporain or Avanti!	Music: George Crumb: Vox Banealea Lighting and set design: Mikki Kunttu Costume design: Erika Turunen Sound design: Marco Melchior	Tero Saarinen Company in co-operation with Arts 276/Automne en Normandie (France) and Red Brick Project/CNN Roubaix Nord – Pas de Calais - Carolyn Carlson (France)
Absent Presence	2011-11-23, Alexander Theatre, Helsinki, Finland	Tero Saarinen Company	Lighting design: Mikki Kunttu Costume design: Erika Turunen Music: Jarmo Saari - Jarmo Saari solu	Tero Saarinen Company in co-operation with Alexander Theatre
MESH	2014-02-02, Saitama Arts Theatre, Tokyo, Japan	Saitama Dance Association in co-operation with Saitama Arts Theatre	Lighting design: Iwashina Takeaki Costume design: Izumi Miyamura Music: collage	Saitama Dance Association, Tero Saarinen Company
VORTEX(Haeori)	2014-04-16, National Theater of Korea, Soul, South Korea	National Dance Company of Korea	Lighting design: Mikki Kunttu Costume design: Erika Turunen Music: Be-being	National Dance Company of Korea
Morphed	2014-08-16, Finnish National Opera, Helsinki Festival, Helsinki, Finland	Tero Saarinen Company	Lighting design: Mikki Kunttu Costume design: Teemu Muurimäki Music: Esa-Pekka Salonen	Tero Saarinen Company in co-operation with Helsinki Festival and Opéra Théàtre de Saint-Ètienne
Kullervo	2015-02-13, Finnish National Opera, Helsinki, Finland	Finnish National Opera and Ballet and Tero Saarinen Company	Lighting design: Mikki Kunttu Costume design : Erika Turunen Music: Jean Sibelius: Kullervo (Symphony Op. 7)	Tero Saarinen Company in co-operation with Finnish National Opera
TRAIL	2015-12-12, Kenya National Theatre, Nairobi, Kenya	Ghetto Exposed	Lighting design: Ville Konttinen Music: collage	Tero Saarinen Company in co-operation with Ghetto Exposed
Loopit	2017-2-4, Hällä Stage, Tampere, Finland	Dance Theatre MD	Lighting design: Ville Konttinen Costume design: Erika Turunen Music: collage (The Tiger Lillies)	Dance Theatre MD in co-operation with Tero Saarinen Company
Zimmermann Trio	2018-1-19, Walt Disney Concert Hall, Los Angeles, USA	Tero Saarinen Company and Los Angeles Philharmonic	Lighting and set design: Mikki Kunttu Costume design, Element construction: Erika Turunen Music: Bernd Alois Zimmermann: Cello Concerto en forme de pas de trois (1966)	LA Phil in co-operation with Tero Saarinen Company
Breath	2018-4-12, Grand Théâtre de Québec, Quebec City, Canada	Tero Saarinen Company and Kimmo Pohjonen	Lighting and set design: Mikki Kunttu Costume design: Teemu Muurimäki Music: Kimmo Pohjonen	Tero Saarinen Company in co-operation with Tampere hall and Alexander Theatre
Third Practice	2019-5-29, Teatro Amilcare Ponchielli, Rassegna di Danza & Festival Monteverdi, Cremona, Italy	Tero Saarinen Company and Helsinki Baroque Orchestra	Music: Claudio Monteverdi Music direction, Arrangement: Aapo Häkkinen; Lighting and set design: Eero Auvinen (TTT-Theatre); Projection design Thomas Freundlich; Costume design: Erika Turunen; Sound design: Marco Melchior	Tero Saarinen Company Supported by Jane & Aatos Erkko Foundation (Finland) In collaboration with Fondazione Teatro Amilcare Ponchielli (Italy); With thanks to Rassegna di Danza & Festival Monteverdi (Fondazione Teatro A. Ponchielli, Cremona, Italy), ATER – Associazione Teatrale Emilia Romagna (Italy), Kuopio Dance Festival (Finland), Stoa (Finland), the Finnish National Theatre and TTT-Theatre (Finland)

== Grants and prizes ==
Saarinen has received numerous acknowledgements of his work as an artist. In 2001 he was awarded the Finland Prize and, in 2005 the Pro Finlandia medal – the most prestigious award given to artists in Finland. Saarinen was awarded the international Movimientos Dance Prize for Best Male Performer in Germany in 2004. In June 2004, he was honoured with the title of Chevalier de l’Ordre des Arts et des Lettres by the Ministry of Culture in France.

Saarinen received a 6-month grant from the Arts Council of Finland in 1987, a 3-year grant in 1996, and a 5-year grant in 1996 and 2004. At the beginning of his career as a choreographer he was awarded numerous other scholarships and grants, including from the Väinö Tanner Foundation, Antti and Jenni Wihuri Foundation, and the Finnish Cultural Foundation.

- First prize in the contemporary dance category at the third Concours International de Danse de Paris in 1988
- Silver medal, contemporary choreography, ITI Ballet Competition, Helsinki, 1991
- Phillip Morris Ballet Flower award, 1993
- Jury award for interpretation in Les Nuits de la Danse d’Istres competition in France, 1996
- Finland prize, 2001
- Culture Prize, City of Helsinki, 2002
- International Movimientos Dance Prize, Best male performer, Germany 2004
- Chevalier de L’Ordre des Arts et des Lettres, France 2004
- Pro Finlandia, 2005
- The Finnish Cultural Foundation, award for artistic achievements, 2008
- Jean Sibelius commemorative coin, 2015

== See also ==
- Official website, Tero Saarinen Company
- Tero Saarinen in Tanka - the Finnish Dance Database.
