= Tero =

Tero or TERO may refer to:

- Tero (given name)
- Police Tero F.C., a Thai football club based in Bangkok
- BEC-TERO, an entertainment conglomerate in Thailand
- Tero Saarinen Company, a Finnish dance group
- Lawrence Tero, the actor/wrestler known professionally as "Mr. T"
