= Lea Ved =

American dancer

- Born: April 9, 1991 (age 35); Anaheim, California, U.S.
- Education: Juilliard School
- Occupations: Dancer; choreographer
- Years active: 2013-present
- Career
- Current group: Nederlands Dans Theater
- Former groups: Royal Swedish Ballet; Gothenburg opera’s dance company; RUBBERBANDance Group

Lea Elizabeth Ved (born April 9, 1991) is an American contemporary dancer and choreographer. She was a second soloist contemporary dancer at the Royal Swedish Ballet, dancing with the company from 2016 until 2018. Ved currently dances with Nederlands Dans Theater.

== Early life, training, and education ==
Ved was born on April 9, 1991, in Anaheim, California, to Jiten and Elizabeth Ved. She began dancing when she was three years old, studying at the San Francisco Ballet's school. She later moved with her family to Raleigh, North Carolina, and trained in ballet, jazz, and contemporary dance at Carolina Dance Center from eighth grade through high school. Ved, who is of Indian and Filipino descent, grew up also performing Indian classical dance and traditional Filipino dance. In 2006 she attended the summer training program at Boston Ballet. She graduated from William G. Enloe GT/IB Center for the Humanities, Sciences, and the Arts in 2009. Later that year she co-founded Reveal, a touring weekend dance workshop that presented at dance studios in North Carolina, Chicago, Massachusetts, and Iceland. She studied dance at the Juilliard School, graduating in 2013 with choreographic honors. While an undergraduate student at Juilliard, Ved was a member of the Juilliard Dance Ensemble, performing in Aiken, South Carolina, and was chosen to perform at the Edinburgh International Festival in Scotland. In 2010 she worked as a part of Juilliard's Performing Educational Programs for Schools. In 2011 she was selected as a choreographer for the Choreographers & Composers Workshop. At Juilliard Ved performed newly created works by Andrea Miller, Raewyn Hill, and Pam Tanowitz and repertoire by José Limón and Mark Morris. She also attended the Alonzo King Lines Ballet summer program, and worked with Victor Quijada, DanakaDance, Jill Johnson, and Sidra Bell at the Springboard Montreal and the Movement Invention Project. At Juilliard she also performed works by Nacho Duato, William Forsythe, Gustavo Ramirez Sansano, and Alexander Ekman. Her student choreography was showcased in Canada and the United States as part of the Toronto Outreach Exchange Strategy and the DaretoCreate Dance Collective. In 2012 she was one of seven recipients of the Dizzy Feet Scholarship Award.

== Career ==
After graduating from Juilliard, Ved joined the RUBBERBAND, a contemporary hip-hop dance company in Montreal. In 2015 she was a nominee for choreography at the Rolex Mentor & Protégé Arts Initiative. She was featured in a work titled Brain, The Inside Story which was exhibited at and produced by the American Museum of Natural History. She left RUBBERBANDance Group in July 2016 to join the Royal Swedish Ballet as a contemporary dancer. She danced with the Royal Swedish Ballet until June 2018, having reached the rank of second soloist in 2017. While at the ballet, she also worked as a choreographer for Gothenburg opera’s dance company. She was also chosen as a selected choreographer of the Royal Swedish Ballet's National Collaboration in 2018. While at the ballet, she performed the role of Julia in Mats Ek's contemporary ballet Julia and Romeo. She also danced in Alexander Ekman's Midsommarnattsdröm, Sharon Eyal's Bill and Half Life, and Wim Vandekeybus's PUUR. In August 2018 she joined Nederlands Dans Theater. As a dancer at Nederlands Dans Theatre, Ved has led workshops teaching the company's repertoire.

Ved has also continued to work with Victor Quijada, teaching the RUBBERBANDdance method and assistant directing and staging the company's repertoire at Springboard Danse Montreal, USC Kaufman School of Dance, the University of North Carolina School of the Arts, and Domaine Forget. She has also hosted creative workshops at The Playground NYC and No)One Art House in Los Angeles. Ved has choreographed with L-E-V Company, Hofesh Shechter, and Crystal Pite.

In April 2018 Ved's work titled These Parts We Cannot Hold was performed at the Skånes Dansteater in Malmö, Sweden.
