= Terol =

Terol is a surname. Notable people with the surname include:

- Joost Terol (born 1980), Dutch football goalkeeper
- Nicolás Terol (born 1988), Spanish motorcycle road racer

== See also ==
- Tero (given name)
