= Ruusuvuori =

Ruusuvuori is a surname. Notable people with the surname include:

- Aarno Ruusuvuori (1925–1992), Finnish architect, director of the Museum of Finnish Architecture
- Emil Ruusuvuori (born 1999), Finnish tennis player
- Juha Ruusuvuori (born 1957), Finnish freelance writer
