= Minä Peräsmies =

1998 Finnish CD-ROM

Minä Peräsmies is a 1998 Finnish PC-ROM for Windows that consists of comics, games and other content based on the superhero character of Peräsmies who is able to fly by farting "with the power of a thousand hurricanes". The ROM was created by a team at the media company Mediakeisari Oy including Timo Kokkila (the artist), Petri Tuomola and Reima Mäkinen and published and sold by Plan1 Oy. The character became known from the Finnish comic and humor magazine Pahkasika and strips were released from 1983 to 2000.

== Content ==
The ROM includes eight comics, five games (one of which is a printable board game), the Food Circle of Peräsmies and the Museum Center Fiasco (a multimedia Fart Museum and a collection of images). The packaging also contains comic strips and other "stuff".

== Reception ==
The ROM did not receive a mixed reception. Most of the published reviews conclude that it is essentially worth a single quick viewing with some decent artwork and momentarily interesting technical work including the wide array of fart sounds.

== Making-of documentary ==
A making-of has been released on YouTube in two parts. The documentary Näin tehtiin Minä Peräsmies consists of interviews and archive footage from the time of the ROM's making and was made by Reima Mäkinen.
