= Erika Turunen =

Finnish costume designer

Erika Turunen is a Finnish costume designer. The costumes Turunen has designed for opera, theatre and dance productions since the beginning of the 1990s are said to be art in themselves, poetic and sculpture-like. Turunen's signature is the development of new materials, as well as the three-dimensionality of the costumes.

At the age of 15, Turunen started at an art school in Rauma. The local sculptor Kerttu Horila taught Turunen sculpture, encouraged her creativity and steered her towards the arts. In 1998 Turunen began her studies at the School of Arts and Design, in the Department of Fashion and Clothing Design. At first she worked for the Sibelius Academy Opera Studio, and later moved on to the Finnish National Opera.

Turunen was the Head of the Costume Department at the Finnish National Opera from 1995 to 2009. There she designed costumes for works such as The Hobbitt (2001, chor. Marjo Kuusela), Road to Rheims (2002, dir. Dario Fo), The Red Line (2007, dir. Pekka Milonoff), Sleeping Beauty (2008, chor. Javier Torres), Blood Wedding (2011, dir. Cathy Marsten) and Snow Queen (2012, chor. Kenneth Greve).

Erika Turunen has attracted plenty of attention for her work for contemporary dance. In addition to her main work at the National Opera she has also collaborated with choreographers such as Jorma Elo, Marilena Fontoura, Marjo Kuusela, Kenneth Kvarnström, Susanna Leinonen, Kaari Martin, Tero Saarinen, Javier Torres and Jorma Uotinen. The costumes of Tero Saarinen Company’s works HUNT and Borrowed Light have gained a lot of praise internationally.

She has also designed costumes for Nederlands Dans Theater, Ballet de l’Opéra de Lyon, Royal Danish Ballet, Grand Théâtre de Genève and Skånes Dans Theater, as well as the Operas of Malmö and Gothenburg. In 2007 Turunen was in charge of costumes for The Eurovision Song Contest’s hosts and intermission performances. In 2010 Turunen founded her own design studio, Ateljee Hurma, together with Costume and Set Designer Pirjo Liiri-Majava, where, in addition to her work for performing-art productions, she designs costumes for individual artists, as well as evening gowns.
