= Vanhat herrat =

In these panels, Vanhat herrat rejoice because their childhood favorite, Thunderbirds, is back on TV. Quite typically, they then embark on a fantasy of living in the Thunderbirds universe. More of the strip can be viewed on the Finnish Comic Society's page.

Vanhat herrat (Finnish for "The old gentlemen") is a Finnish comic strip drawn by Pauli Heikkilä and written by him and Markku Paretskoi. It was frequently featured in the popular humour magazine Pahkasika, Paretskoi being the magazine's executive editor for its entire run. While preliminary versions of the characters first appeared in a Tampere journalism students' union magazine in 1977, it is generally considered that the characters reached their mature form in 1982. The creators of the strip were awarded the Finnish Comic Society's "Puupää hat" award in 1998.

In 1998–1999 the strip appeared weekly in the urban newspaper Tamperelainen, but in 2000 Pahkasika was discontinued, and the strip has been on hiatus since 2002. That year, all strips from 1982 onwards were collected in a single 222-page volume, "Taru Vanhoista herroista" ("The Legend of the Old Gentlemen" - a play on the name of the Finnish translation of The Lord of the Rings), ISBN 952-9809-56-5.

The strip stars two Finnish men seemingly in their early thirties. Their real names are never given, they are simply called "the blond gentleman" and "the dark-haired gentleman" because of their hair colour. Occasionally, a third main character, their uncle (called the Uncle), also appears. In one episode, the gentlemen also have a son whom they kidnapped from his mother while she was shopping. The son makes short one- or two-frame appearances also in the latter episodes.

Most of the strips are about the main characters having some sort of fantasy adventure, as if reliving their childhood or teenage. These adventures were often rather eccentric, such as one set in Thoreau's Walden. They also flaunt their literacy in a strip where they meet author Veikko Huovinen and incense him by talking exclusively in sentences which contain the title of one of his books.

The gentlemen also frequently drink alcoholic beverages. The nature of their adventures may be understood as the authors' documentation of their own lives as undergraduate university students.

In one strip, it has been shown that both men have a girlfriend. The blond gentleman's girlfriend has dark hair and the dark-haired gentleman's girlfriend is blonde.

Vanhat herrat has not been translated into English, save for a single page which Pahkasika featured in both Finnish and English.
