= Tero (given name) =

Tero is a Finnish masculine given name that may refer to

- Tero Föhr (born 1980), Finnish orienteer
- Tero Järvenpää (born 1984), Finnish javelin thrower
- Tero Kalliolevo (born 1977), Finnish sport quizzer
- Tero Koskela (born 1976), Finnish footballer
- Tero Mäntylä (born 1991), Finnish footballer
- Tero Penttilä (born 1975), Finnish footballer
- Tero Pitkämäki (born 1982), Finnish javelin thrower
- Tero Puha (born 1971), Finnish visual artist, photographer and filmmaker
- Tero Saarinen (born 1964), Finnish dance artist and choreographer, founder of Tero Saarinen Company
- Tero Saviniemi (born 1963), Finnish javelin thrower
- Tero Taipale (born 1972), Finnish footballer
- Tero Tiitu (born 1982), Finnish floorball player
