= Pahkasika =

Finnish humour magazine

Pahkasika (Finnish for "warthog") was a Finnish adult humour magazine, edited by Markku Paretskoi and published from 1975 to 2000.

Unlike the British adult humour comic Viz and the Nordic adult humour magazine Pyton/Myrkky, Pahkasika did not include much blue comedy despite sometimes very ribald jokes. Instead it focused more on such things as alcoholism, family crises, xenophobia and other negative aspects of adult life, all presented in a humorous way that appeared deceptively child-friendly. Some of the jokes in the magazine were almost indistinguishable from articles in a mainstream magazine.

== History ==
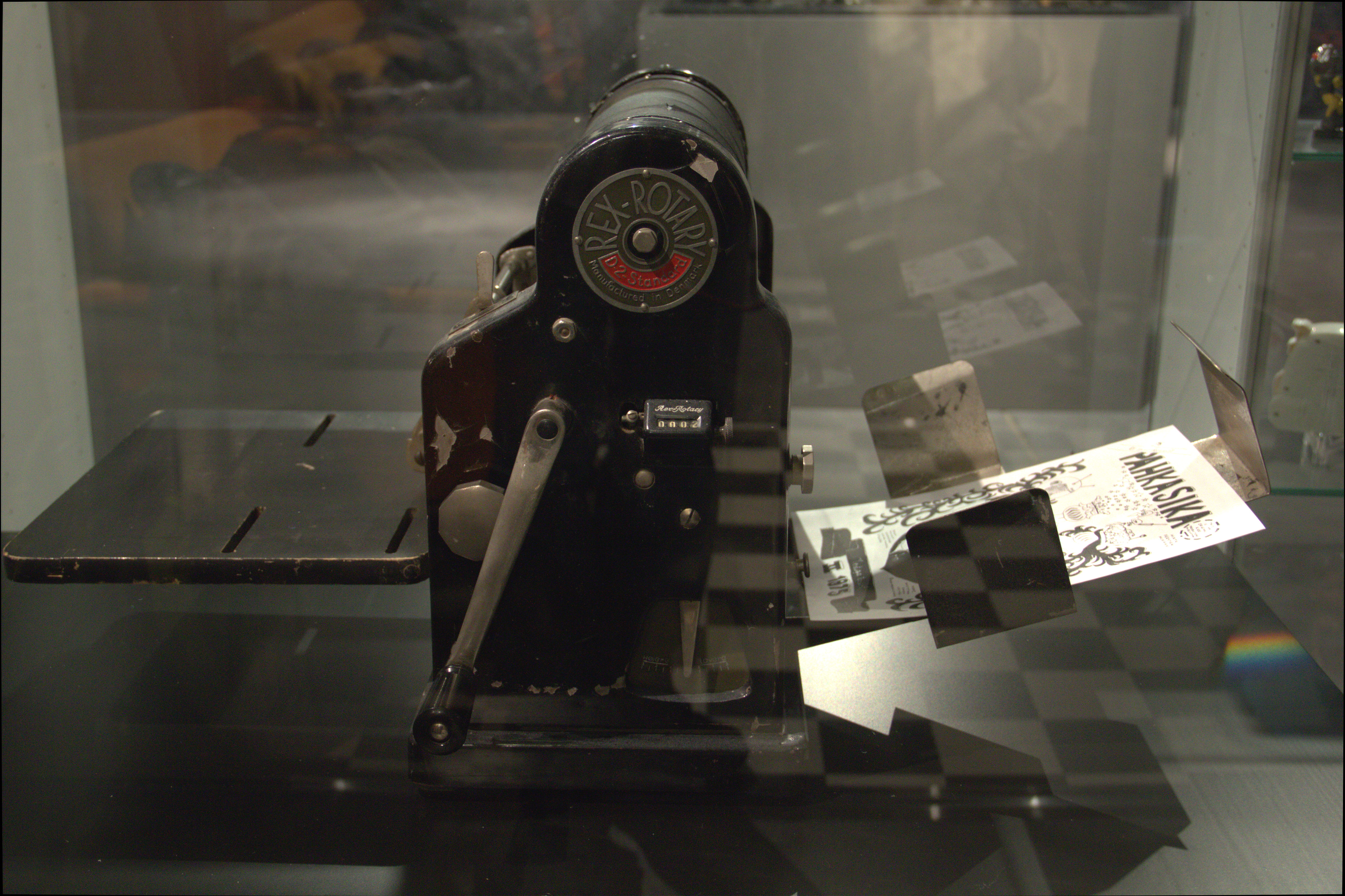
The manually operated mimeograph used for printing the first issues of Pahkasika on display at the Rupriikki Media Museum in Tampere.

Pahkasika was founded by the Vantaa high school students Jukka Mikkola, Markku Paretskoi and Paul Öhrnberg. The first issue was a small edition made by a stolen manually operated mimeograph, sold at the school at graduation day in 1975. The name Pahkasika ("warthog") came from a derogatory word used by Öhrnberg. The students did not intend to continue the magazine after its first issue, but because of its popularity, the decided to print new issues. The next issues of Pahkasika were published at a sporadic schedule in Helsinki. They were printed on an electrically operated mimeograph and two issues were even printed with the printing presses at the Parliament of Finland and at the Finnish head office of Shell plc - in secret.

Paretskoi studied at the University of Tampere and continued printing the magazine in the late 1970s. The contemporary rock and punk fanzines had an influence on the continuation of Pahkasika. According to Mikkola, one issue of Pahkasika was even published as a "cover magazine" for a punk collection. At the same time, production of Pahkasika moved from Helsinki to Tampere. Issue #7 published in 1979 was the first issue printed at a printing press.

The connection to the music press became permanent as the publishing company Fanzine Oy (at the time known as Lehtijussi Oy), known for the Soundi magazine, started publishing Pahkasika in the early 1980s. However Pahkasika itself had ceased to publish articles about music and profiled itself instead of a humour magazine containing absurd humour and parody. At the same time, Juha Ruusuvuori, one of the magazine's most prominent writers, started working at the magazine. Until 1980 the magazine had been sold only via mail order and from hand to hand, but in summer 1980 the magazine started being sold at R-kioski stores and supermarkets, thus establishing its position from 1980 to 1985.

Because of the financial difficulties of its publisher, Pahkasika ceased operations with Fanzine Oy and founded its own publishing company Banana Press Oy in 1985. Issue #24 was Banana Press's first own publication. Paretskoi continued as editor of Pahkasika and Ruusuvuori became the CEO of the new publisher. At its highest, the circulation of Pahkasika was 35 thousand copies and the sales supported the magazine. A significant part of the money needed for the magazine came from mail order: Banana Press sold humorous products advertised in the magazine. These products can still be bought from the website of Banana Press.

During the Early 1990s depression in Finland Pahkasika's activity started waning. Its circulation dropped to below ten thousand copies, and Juha Ruusuvuori resigned from the magazine. The activity of Banana Press started concentrating more and more on mail order, and in 2000 the magazine was discontinued. Editor Markku Paretskoi said that "in our current world magazines such as Pahkasika are needless". Paretskoi meant that reality had become its own parody and could not be parodied any more.

According to Markku Paretskoi, the life of Pahkasika spanned from the first media generation of the people born in the late 1950s and early 1960s to the "triage of the Finnish common culture". When the magazine was born in the 1970s Finland only had two radio and television channels and the average Finn did not have connections outside their own immediate circles. According to Paretskoi, one had to have "at least some sort of education" to understand the jokes in Pahkasika and so the typical reader was academically educated. According to him, the humour in the magazine was tied to its own period and would not necessarily be understood to the reader in the 2020s.

=== Computer games ===
Pahkasika also produced computer games. One of them was "Pahkasian avaruuspläjäys", which was published in 1985 for the Commodore 64 and the IBM PC. The game could be ordered by sending an empty floppy disk to the magazine's office.

== Recurring strips ==
Recurring strips in Pahkasika included:

- Miihkali, a kindergarten-aged boy whose parents are nearly always having a crisis, either with him or with each other, but usually Miihkali doesn't understand what is going on at all.
- Pahkeinen, an old man with a nihilistic attitude to life, and his alcoholic dog who sometimes acts as a guide dog.
- Peräsmies, a parody of Superman (called Teräsmies in Finland), a superhero who could fly by farting loudly due to eating canned pea soup contaminated by an explosion at a nuclear plant.
- Vanhat herrat, two men engaging on adventures, accompanied with relatives and friends all dressed up in black suits or in similar fashion as the two men.
- Hemmo Paskiainen, a wild child in his early teens who hangs out with his friends Stegu and Löka drinking beer, smoking cigarettes and terrorizing other people, especially his father Armas and characters like priests and fine ladies.
- Armas Paskiainen, father of Hemmo Paskiainen. These strips take place in the same universe with Hemmo Paskiainen, but perspective is the father's. Common themes include unsuccessful attempts of fatherhood, cheating Hemmo's mother, eating pills, drinking alcohol, committing suicide and dying.
- Hyvä sinä, short and absurd strips drawn with a distinctive style by Teemu Suviala with a signature "Mies Suviala".
- Kolme Rumaa Teroa, ("Three Ugly Teros") three-frame strips of three guys causing pain and harm to people in various ways. Their usual victims are best categorized as being "politically correct" people.

The magazine also featured irregular articles such as photomanipulations and a course in foreign languages, with all the example phrases having a subtly different (and more humorous) meaning. The magazine also featured regularly lists of one-liner puns. Parodies of different mail-order catalogues were also popular. The mail order catalogues usually had a common theme for all the stuff that was offered. For example, computer games for the elderly -catalog had a molotov cocktail joystick for Winter War veterans. Recurring theme was also imaginary magazines, couple of pages laid out in a way to resemble some other magazine than Pahkasika. These usually made fun of a particular theme. Examples of the sub-magazines include "Kakka" ("poop" in Finnish), parodying zombies as a popular culture theme and "Luksus" ("luxury" in Finnish), making fun about fashionable high society lifestyle magazines. The latter featured a most likely fictitious short interview with the rock singer Juice Leskinen.
