= Peräsmies =

Finnish comic strip

Publication information
- Created by: Timo Kokkila

In-story information
- Alter ego: Kalervo Peränne
- Species: Human
- Place of origin: Earth
- Abilities: Enhanced flatulence ability

Peräsmies is a Finnish underground comic strip drawn by Timo Kokkila that appeared in the Pahkasika magazine from 1983 to 2000.

The strips were initially written by Kokkila together with Sami Laitala. Other scriptwriters have also occasionally participated in the comic.

The comic depicts the adventures of Peräsmies, a Finnish superhero and a parody of Superman. The name Peräsmies literally means "Butt Man" and is a play off Teräsmies ("Steel man") which is the Finnish name for Superman. The "official" English name of Peräsmies, according to Kokkila, is "Phartman", although "Pooperman" might better capture the essence of the original pun.

Peräsmies, whose real name is Kalervo Peränne, is a middle-aged, severely alcoholic homeless man living in a landfill, whose only superpower is the ability to fart supernaturally hard. He gained this power as a result of consuming a can of radioactive pea soup, pea soup being the stereotypical flatulence-inducing dish in Finland.

Peräsmies uses farting primarily as a rocket engine, which enables him to fly. On some occasions Peräsmies has used farts as a chemical weapon. His farts have also had more esoteric uses such as melting holes in ice. Despite his alcoholism and lack of any semblance of personal hygiene, he has good intentions and often manages to save the world in the end.

One notable Peräsmies strip set the hero against his Soviet counterpart, Toveri Pieru ("Comrade Fart"). They first competed against each other by saving people from disasters, but finally Peräsmies challenged Toveri Pieru to a drinking competition, which Peräsmies won. The strip ended with a moral lesson:

Remember, children — violence is not a solution to problems, but alcohol is.

Peräsmies was killed when he was run over by a drunk driver in the last issue of Pahkasika. He had been drinking in a bar with the driver and he asked the driver to hand over the car keys, saying that he would also walk home instead of flying due to both of them being seriously intoxicated. He was unaware that the driver had spare keys and still decided to go with the car, running over Peräsmies. His body was later incinerated in a waste incineration center, classified as hazardous waste. This information was announced in the last issue of Pahkasika (3/2000). His son, whose real name is Pera Ilmala later inherited his father's powers and continued his legacy as Peräspoika. A sequel titled Peräsmiehen poika ("Son of Peräsmies") has been appearing in the Koululainen magazine since 2003.

The Finnish Film Foundation has agreed to support the Finnish film studio Helsinki-filmi to make a film about Peräsmies.

He was featured in the 1998 CD-ROM game Minä Peräsmies.
