= Jarmo Saari =

Finnish musician

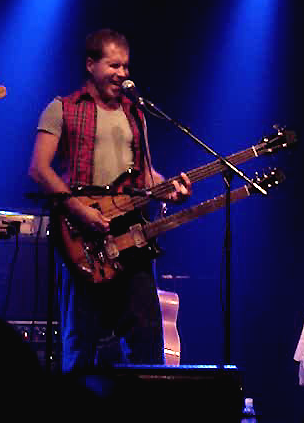
Jarmo Saari in 2007.

Jarmo Ilari Saari (born 14 March 1970) is a Finnish guitarist, composer and producer. He has played in the bands XL, ZetaBoo and Anna-Mari Kähärän orkesteri as well as published three solo records as a part of his Solu-project. In 2012 Jarmo Saari founded the band Jarmo Saari Republic together with three drummers. In 2012 Saari was also awarded with the Finland Award (Finnish: Suomi-palkinto) for his artistic work.

Saari was born in Kauniainen, Finland. When he was a child, Saari sung in a choir and played the cello and trombone. He received his first guitar at the age of ten, and it later became his main instrument. In 1992 Saari begun his studies at the Jazz Department of Sibelius Academy in Helsinki, where he studied the guitar and composing. Saari graduated as a Master of Music in 1999. His graduate concert at the Savoy Theatre in Helsinki was an audiovisual experience.

Jarmo Saari is best known for his contributions in Finnish jazz music. Jarmo Saari's style has been described as visual, and his compositions combine the guitar, human voice and rare instruments in a multidimensional way. Saari performed as a solo artist for the first time in 2000. His solo project goes by the name Jarmo Saari Solu (English: Jarmo Saari Cell). Jarmo Saari has worked together with multiple notable Finnish musicians such as Jukka Perko, Anna-Mari Kähärä, Emma Salokoski, UMO Jazz Orchestra and Tuomari Nurmio. Saari has also composed music for numerous Finnish movies and collaborated with choreographer Tero Saarinen.
