= Dance House Helsinki =

Coordinates: 60°09′44.8″N 24°54′20.9″E

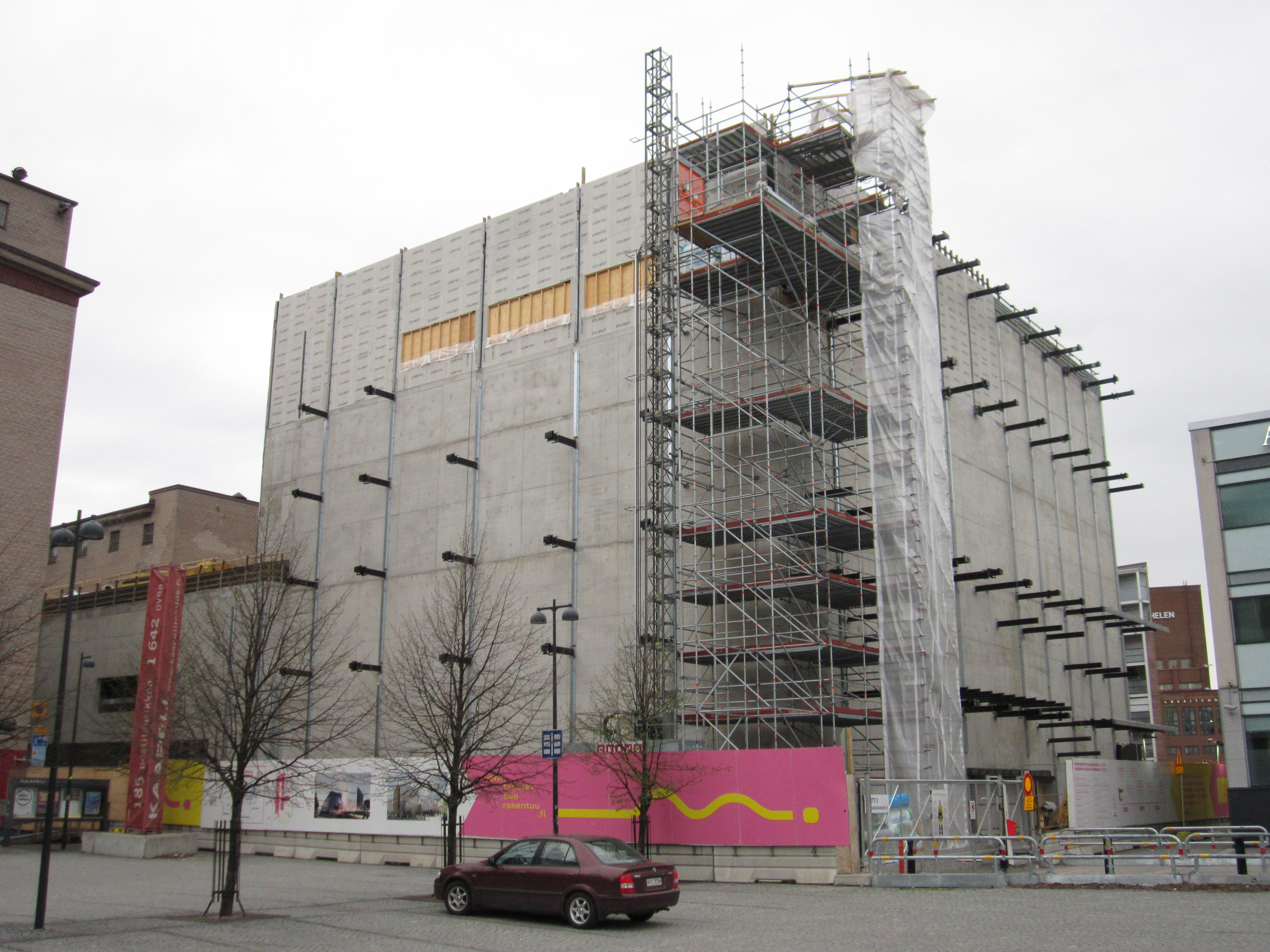
Dance House Helsinki under construction in May 2021.

Dance House Helsinki (Finnish: Tanssin talo, literally "the house of dance") is a theatre building in the Ruoholahti district of Helsinki, Finland, next to the Kaapelitehdas building.

== History ==
The first ideas of founding a theatre stage concentrating on dance date back to the 1930s, when they were expressed by Maggie Gripenberg. A possibility to convert the VR warehouses in Vallila to a dance stage was investigated in the 1990s. In 2010, the association Tanssin talo ry was founded to further the cause of artistic dance and construct the Dance House building. Planning of new premises at Kaapelitehdas started in 2016, funded by the Kone foundation, the Finnish state and the city of Helsinki. The building was planned to be completed in 2020.

=== Construction ===
The Dance House project moved forward when the state decided to take part in constructing the new building and funding the activity of the Dance House in 2015. The state funded the project by six million euro, as did the city of Helsinki. The Jane and Aatos Erkko Foundation had previously funded the project by 15 million euro.

The new theatre at Kaapelitehdas concentrating on dance is planned to open in early 2022. The Dance House will begin to build its program along with a dance theatre, a modern dance group and a production house: dance theatre Hurjaruuth, the Tero Saarinen Company and the Zodiak modern dance centre were chosen as partners of the Dance House. The number of partners is expected to grow in the future. Future partners might include established dance groups and theatres as well as festivals and production houses.

Matti Numminen was chosen as the operational director of the Dance House, but his term ended in October 2020 after he had fallen out of favour with the board of directors, which was probably influenced by controversy regarding the name of the building. The Dance House was renamed Form in May 2020, but the name received a lot of negative feedback and in July 2020 the building was renamed back to Tanssin talo. Producer Niki Matheson replaced Numminen was operative directory. Mikael Aaltonen was chosen as the program director.

The foundation of the building was laid in late January 2020. The building was jointly designed by JKMM Architects and ILO Architects. The new building with 5000 square metres of total floor space is expected to cost about 27 million euro and has been funded by the Jane and Aatos Erkko Foundation, the city of Helsinki and the Finnish state. The 1500 square metres of floor space in need of renovation at Kaapelitehdas will be funded from the budget of Kaapelitehdas, costing about 7.8 million euro.

The final cost of the construction of Dance House Helsinki was slightly over 40 million euro.

== Premises ==
Dance House Helsinki will hold two halls, of which the larger Erkko hall will have 700 spaces and the smaller Pannuhalli already existing at Kaapelitehdas will have 250 spaces. As well as the performance halls, the building will host a restaurant and an events square, serving both as a foyer and an event space on its own.

In November to December 2020 a competition was held for an illuminated artwork at the lobby of Dance House Helsinki, depicting the architectural nature of the building as well as dance.
