= Juha Ruusuvuori =

Finnish freelance writer (born 1957)

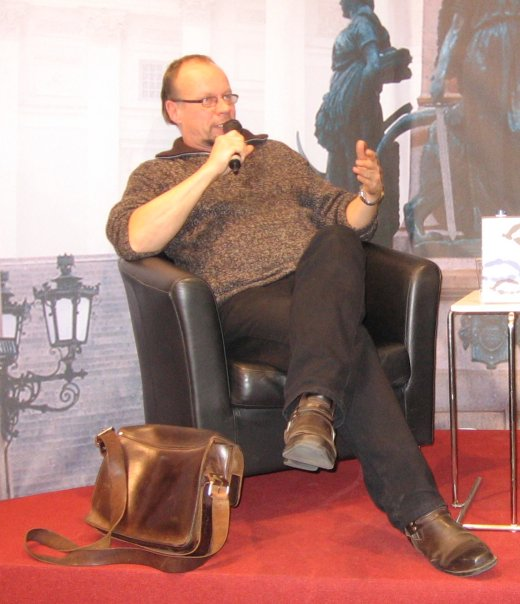
Juha Ruusuvuori

Juha Ensio Ruusuvuori (born 16 July 1957) is a Finnish freelance writer. He was born in Oulu, and graduated to Master of Arts from the university of Tampere in 1987. He has worked as photographer in the news paper Kaleva, editor in TV-news of Yleisradio and in radio news and as publication editor in Banana Press Oy.

Ruusuvuori has been come to known as editor of the humour magazine Pahkasika and as publication editor. He has moved from Tampere to Dalsbruk in Kimitoön, where he writes among other things columns.
