= Tero Puha =

Finnish artist, photographer and filmmaker (born 1971)

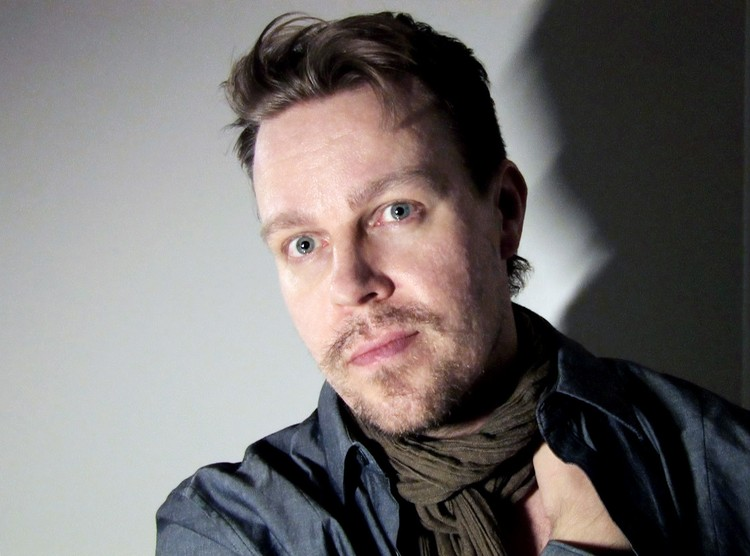
- Born: 1971 (age 54–55)
- Known for: Visual art, photography, filmmaking
- Website: www.teropuha.com

Tero Puha (born 1971) is a Finnish visual artist, photographer and filmmaker. His work often studies and explores the body image, identities and consumerism in the modern world. He is known for his aesthetic body studies as well as performances and video art. His retrospective book, Almost Human-Works 1995–2010, was published in 2011.

== Personal life ==
Puha has worked in the last few years mainly outside Finland (London, Paris and Berlin).

== Publications ==
- Almost Human-Works 1995–2010. Inky Robot, 2011. Over 200 illustrations and with essays by Leevi Haapala, Leena-Maija Rossi, Annamari Vänskä, Livia Hekanaho and Anna-Kaisa Rastenberger. A retrospective.

== Awards ==
- 2014: Finnish State Prize in Photographic Arts

== Solo exhibitions ==
- Unfinished, Finnish Museum of Photography, Helsinki, November 2010–January 2011
- The Mirror That Lived, Turun Taidehalli, Turku, Finland, November–December 2024

== Collections ==
Puha's work is held in the following permanent collections:

- Museum of Contemporary Art Kiasma
- Helsinki City Art Museum
- Finnish Museum of Photography
- Brandts Museum of Photographic Art
- Kiyosato Museum of Photographic Arts, in Japan
