= Marita Liulia =

Finnish artist (born 1957)

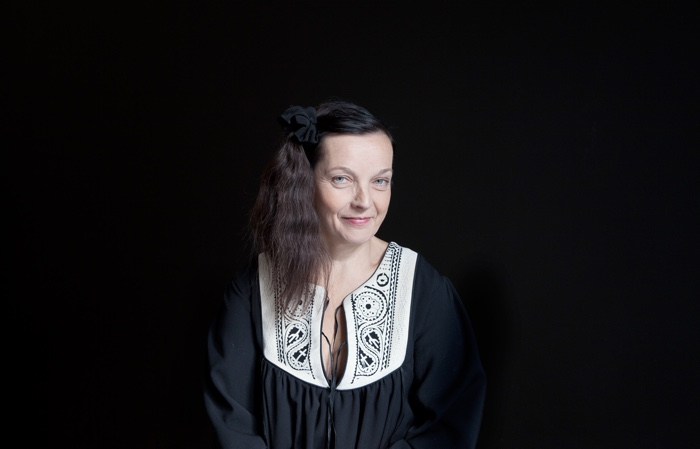
- Portrait of Marita Liulia by Jari Kolehmainen, 2015.
- Born: 27 October 1957 (age 68); Perho, Finland
- Website: www.maritaliulia.com

Marita Liulia (born 27 October 1957 in Perho, Finland) is a visual artist working primarily in interactive multimedia. Her debut CD-ROM Maire (1994) was among the first works of art published in this format in the world. Her production includes multi-platform media artworks, photography, paintings, short films, books and stage performances. Her works have been exhibited and performed in 50 countries and she has received numerous international awards. Liulia first became interested in photography, painting, experimental film and cultural history while studying at Savonlinna Upper Secondary School of Art and Music. She continued her artistic studies at the University of Art and Design Helsinki, and broadened her horizons also by studying aesthetics, literature and political history at the University of Helsinki, graduating with a Bachelor of Arts in 1986.

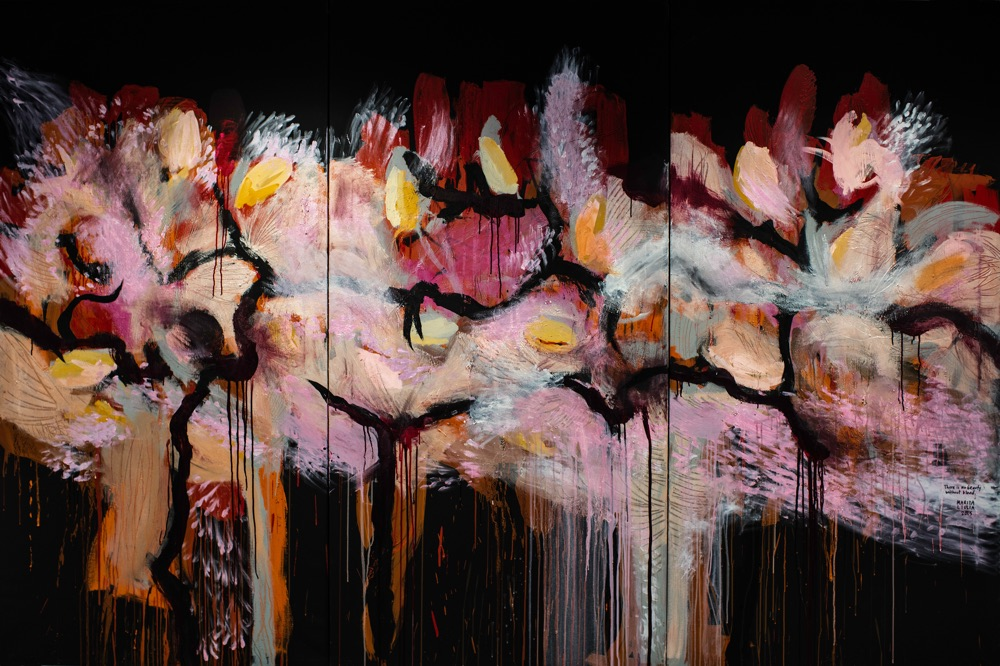
There Is No Beauty Without Blood by Marita Liulia, 2015.

Liulia lives and works in Helsinki and Heinola, Finland. She is the owner and director of Medeia Ltd., a production company founded in 1997 which distributes her art and design works worldwide.

Marita Liulia has received numerous awards including Prix Möbius International, Prix Ars Electronica, Finland Prize and the Finnish Cultural Fund Prize for her achievements as an artist. She founded media culture competition Prix Möbius Nordica in 2000.

== Artistic career ==
Marita Liulia's started her artistic career in the theatre and during the 1980s she experimented with many different art forms. In cooperation with lighting and sound designers Ilkka Volanen and Tarja Ervasti she created several installation art pieces (e.g. Bone and Wing (1985), Zenon (1985), Mummies (1988), Testament (1988)), as well as multidisciplinary artworks in different media formats (e.g. Daimonion (1988), 8 min. from the Sun (1987) and To Indonesia (1986).

During the 1980s Liulia worked in different professions, for instance as a photographer and journalist in Southeast Asia and North Africa. "Liulia, who is fascinated by Asian culture, says she doesn’t mind travelling. As a child, she suffered from a long-term illness that forced her to stay home. Now she's making up for lost time."

Liulia about her transition to large multimedia projects: "(In the) late 1980s I started to study postmodern and gender theories with great appetite and ended up combining my old skills to new ideas to new technologies. It was a moment in my life when I finished writing the concept of the Jackpot interactive installation in 1991. After discussing with technicians I suddenly realized there is no other way - I had to start to work with computers. I used computers in the 1980s already while making sound and light installations. By the early nineties I had started to direct a team of professionals. Production of large multimedia programs started." She further explained her choice of art form in 2005: "Interactive multimedia was a very welcome format for me, since I had most of the necessary skills for directing it. I thought the monitor is a small theatre where all magic can happen… I also like to work in a team and I have always been curious about new technologies, especially the possibilities they offer me as an artist. My favourite tools are a computer and a camera."

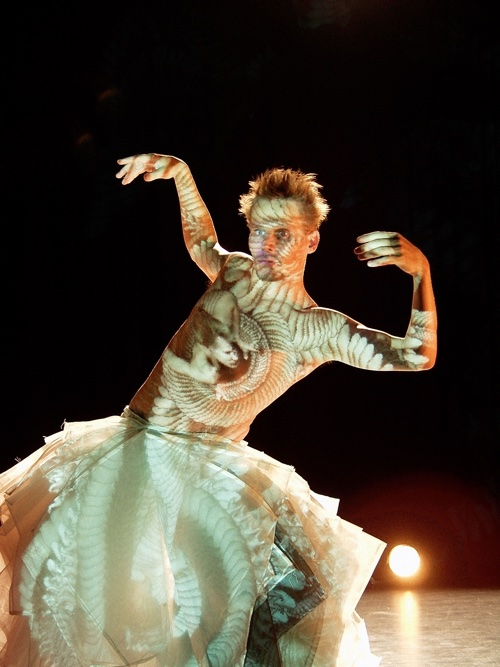
HUNT by Marita Liulia and Tero Saarinen.

Liulia described her art in 2005: "I mainly portray contemporary people from many points of view and use various media platforms to reach different audiences. I'm a writer, a visual artist, but also a researcher and producer. In my versatile works I combine different art forms, research and technology. For me art is communication, and I use communication systems of today in order to make my art available for people in their different environments." Marita Liulia creates her multimedia art for a specific target audience: "I’m extremely interested in the people who use it."

In 2001 Marita Liulia returned to the theatre, with the collaborative works Manipulator and Animator, which were both created with musician and composer Kimmo Pohjonen.

HUNT, a dance performance realized together with choreographer and dancer Tero Saarinen, has gained international success. Tero Saarinen's interpretation of Igor Stravinsky's The Rite of Spring in collaboration with multimedia artist Marita Liulia has been performed 174 times, in 82 cities and 32 countries in Asia, Africa, South and North America as well as in Europe. International critics praised HUNT for its deep intensity, imagination and technical expertise. "In ”HUNT”, a mesmerizing solo he created for himself to Stravinsky's ”Rite of Spring,” he (Saarinen) is both the hunter and the hunted, assaulted by inner demons. These are symbolized by a stream of animated images that the highly creative media artist Marita Liulia generates on the spot and projects on his body. It is time for Mr. Saarinen and his company to be seen at length in the United States."

== Notable work ==
Self-portraits 1980-90, from Schjerfbeck to Video Grate, 1990

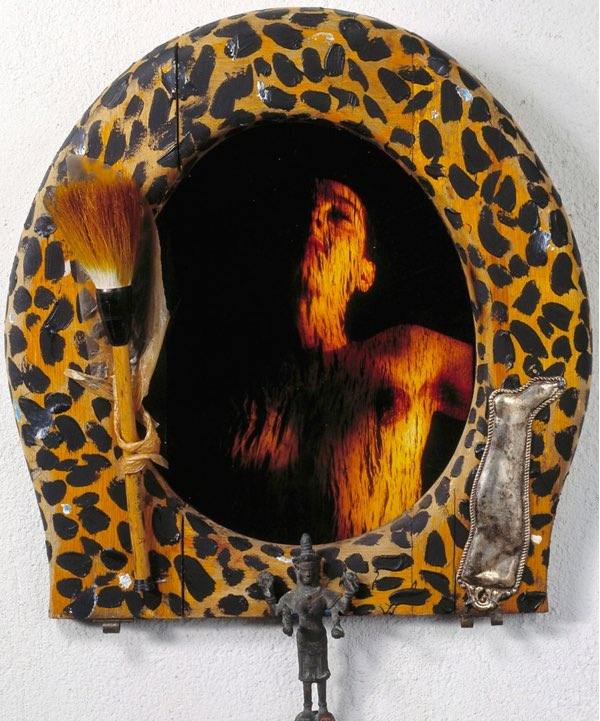
Self-Portrait 1988-1990 by Marita Liulia.

Religion and Prostitution (paintings), 1990

Jackpot, 1991

An interactive installation piece exploring the world of advertising. Marita Liulia about Jackpot in 2004: "Advertising seems to be an unavoidable part of our daily life. I thought the context is an important part of the content. We think differently about images according to the context. I let people check if they can recognise this and build up a computer program in which one can see the results immediately. The format and interface was inspired by a popular game called Jackpot".

Maire, 1994

An interactive installation piece and CD-ROM researching Finnish modernism. ”The aim was to combine art, technology and science." According to Marita Liulia, this slogan was formulated in the 1930s by the Finnish arch-modernists Maire Gullichsen and architect Alvar Aalto. In Liulia's opinion it is also an apt description of Maire CD-ROM: "Maire presents a cheerful postmodern look at modernism, the movement which would become a dramatic influence in Finland. Maire follows the evolution of modernism from the 1930s to the present day." It can also be perceived as "an art historic essay, with supplementary material added on the subject of Maire Gullichsen's life". -> website info

Ambitious Bitch, 1996

An extensive multimedia piece published in interactive CD-ROM format. Ambitious Bitch explored views of femininity in the modern world. It was also Marita Liulia's international artistic breakthrough. According to Marita Liulia, "Ambitious Bitch is a contemporary Western woman: well-educated, witty, understanding but demanding, fighting against old role models but always ready to laugh – even at herself. She may be a man-eater but definitely not a man-hater! Ambitious Bitch, distinctively combining art, research and technology, is a visual and intellectually playful outlook on Western femininity of our times. The many faces of femininity (and feminism) are revealed with sharp quotes by contemporary icons ranging from Mae West to Madonna, from Alexandra Kollontai to Vivienne Westwood. The playful sound design and excellent graphics add to the joy of discovery."

Ambitious Bitch also provoked questions about Liulia's feminism in her art, and she discussed the matter in 2000: "The field of the new media developed simultaneously with the high tide of feminism. Lots of (young) women got involved - expecting to avoid patriarchal hierarchies typical of the "old media" - like film. I considered studying film in the 1980s but quickly realized I will be 50 before the guys in power will allow me to make my first feature film - until that I would have also run out of ideas, I thought. None of my female film director friends ever made a feature film. In the multimedia nobody knew so much how to play boss. These days I think a female director is not a strange creature from outer space...but you have to be "a bulldozer", as you put it once. No mistakes allowed. Since this promising start the number of female students in technology has declined rapidly. (...) Me a cyber-feminist? Why not! It depends what you mean by this. Does it mean one is a feminist? For me it simply means a person who wants equality. Even in cyberspace. Let's add cyberspace to the list indeed (laughter) Some feminism is needed there, too." -> website info

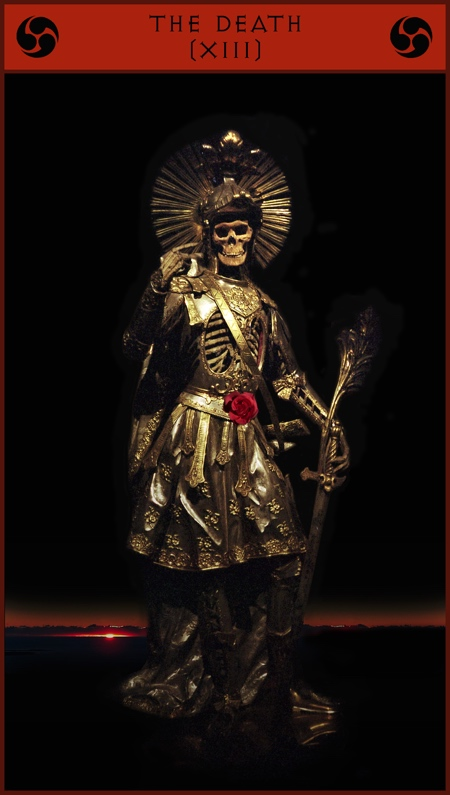
Marita Liulia Tarot, The Death XIII.

Son of a Bitch (SOB), 1999

Liulia's first entirely fictional piece was also published in interactive CD-ROM format. SOB contemplated manhood and masculinity based on extensive research on Men's Studies. SOB's protagonist is Jacques L. Froid, a psychoanalyst of English-French origin. Marita Liulia about SOB in 1999: "After several years' immersion in women's issues I couldn't help but turn my gaze towards men. While women were fighting for their rights, exploring new areas and rewriting history into herstory, what was happening to men?” Liulia asks, and continues: “I lovingly named the CD-ROM Son of a Bitch. Our SOB man is a self-assured object of the viewer’s gaze. SOB is a (post)modern, urban, Western male. SOB’s problems may be new, but so are his possibilities. SOB turns his gaze toward the future rather than the past. Thus some old concepts like masculinity have to be reconsidered. What does the notion ‘man’ actually mean? Behind the obvious concepts we find constantly changing meanings." "I spent three years delving into the man’s world,” says Liulia. "I began to realise that men’s roles are much narrower than those of women." -> website info

Marita Liulia Tarot, 2003

Liulia's take on the traditional game of Tarot has been exhibited in many countries since its première show in Italy in 2003. "Multimedia artist Marita Liulia got her first deck of Tarot cards back in 1981. (...) The project combined the artist’s interests in cultural history, sociology and popular culture. (...) "The Tarot is a powerfully symbolic and visual, textual base that proceeds through a person’s life,” she explains. “The 78 cards represent various stages of life and different types of people. The game is played using several ‘tables.’ The simplest of these is based on who you are, and that in turn is based on when you were born.” According to Liulia, Marita Liulia Tarot is a multiplatform concept which consists of 78 original art works, printed cards deck, a book, a website and interactive mobile phone versions. This popular “life skills game” has been translated into ten languages. The solo museum exhibitions include the prémiere in Museo Laboratorio d'arte Contemporanea dell'Universita La Sapienz, Rome, Italy (2003), HARA Museum of Contemporary Art, Tokyo, Japan (2003), The Centre of Photography, Copenhagen, Denmark (2004), Amos Anderson Art Museum, Helsinki, Finland (2004), Conde Duque, The City Museum of Madrid, Madrid, Spain (2005), National Gallery and National Museum of Thailand, Bangkok, Thailand (2006). She has frequently performed as a witch during Marita Liulia Tarot shows, for instance at Techfest in 2014, IIT Bombay, Mumbai, India. Marita Liulia pondered on the question of why people are so interested in Tarot in 2014: "People are interested in themselves. Tarot hardly tells you anything you don't know or feel already. The important thing is to want to understand what you already know. Sometimes we choose to be blind… I use Tarot as a thinking tool when I concentrate on a situation, a social issue, or a puzzling problem." -> website info

Choosing My Religion, 2009

According to Liulia, Choosing My Religion views the major religions of the world particularly from the female point of view, and juxtaposes Christianity, Judaism, Islam, Sikhism, Hinduism, Buddhism, Confucianism, Taoism and Shinto. "The artist, who is also the model in her photos, has placed herself in roles that normally are reserved for men. The exhibition is divided into an artistic and a factual section. The artistic part focuses on the intense experiences offered by religions, while the factual section highlights the role of religions as our mental tools." In an exhibition introduction for Bomuldsfabriken in 2014: "Liulia views religions as an artist, as a researcher, and as a woman. This integrated set of works is made up of individual artworks that draw on the stories and visual worlds of the nine religions, along with factual works that set out their founding ideas." A touring museum exhibition of Choosing My Religion consists of circa 80 photographs, 15 paintings, a holographic projection, media installations, documentaries and books. The production includes also a Choosing My Religion website. The première of the touring exhibition was held in Kiasma, the Museum of Contemporary Art in Helsinki, Finland, in 2009. -> website info

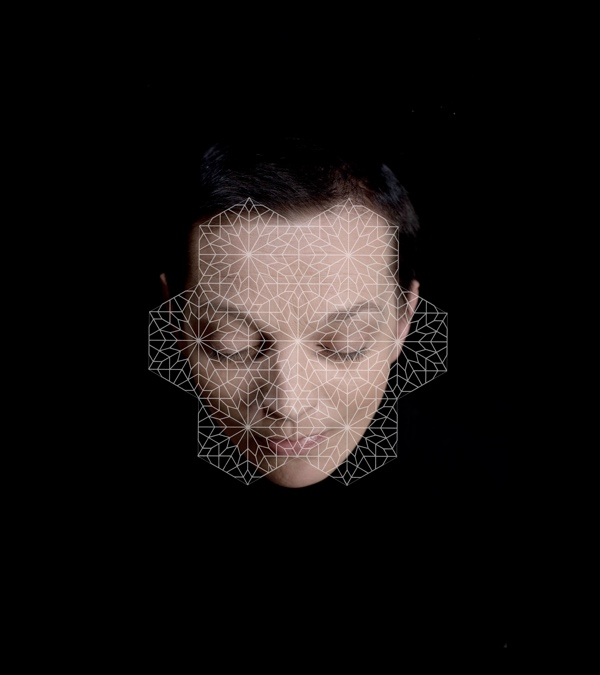
Arabesque from Marita Liulia's Choosing My Religion.

== Collaborations ==
- Manipulator, with musician and composer Kimmo Pohjonen, 2001
- HUNT, with dancer and choreographer Tero Saarinen, 2002 -> website info
- Animator, with Kimmo Pohjonen, 2004 -> website info
- Time Perspective, with Valérie Gabail (soprano), Mikko Perkola (viola da gamba), 2008
- The Accordion Man, an animation film with Kimmo Pohjonen, 2009 -> website info
- Return of the Goddess, a short film, Virpi Pahkinen (dance), Sussan Deyhim and Richard Horowitz (music), 2012 -> website info
- Swan Song, a dance theatre performance, Minna Tervamäki, Ima Iduozee (dance), Tomas Djupsjöbacka and Ali Kesanto (music), 2014

== Publications ==
- Marita Liulia Manual, Marita Liulia, WSOY, Finland, (in English and French), 1999
- Marita Liulia, Art in the Age of Availability, Stella Bottai and Antonella Sbrilli Eletti, La Sapienza, Italy (English, Swedish), 2003
- Tarot, Marita Liulia and Tiina Porthan, Publishing House Teos, Finland (Finnish), 2004 and 2009
- Choosing My Religion – Uskontoja jäljittämässä, Marita Liulia, Maahenki, Finland, (English and Finnish), 2009
- Golden Age, Marita Liulia, Parvs Publishing Ltd, Finland (Finnish and English), 2016
- Marita Liulia, Pauli Sivonen, Arja Maunuksela, Parvs Publishing Ltd, Finland (Finnish and English), 2017
