= Alexander Theatre =

Opera house and theater in Helsinki, Finland

Coordinates: 60°09′48″N 24°55′59″E

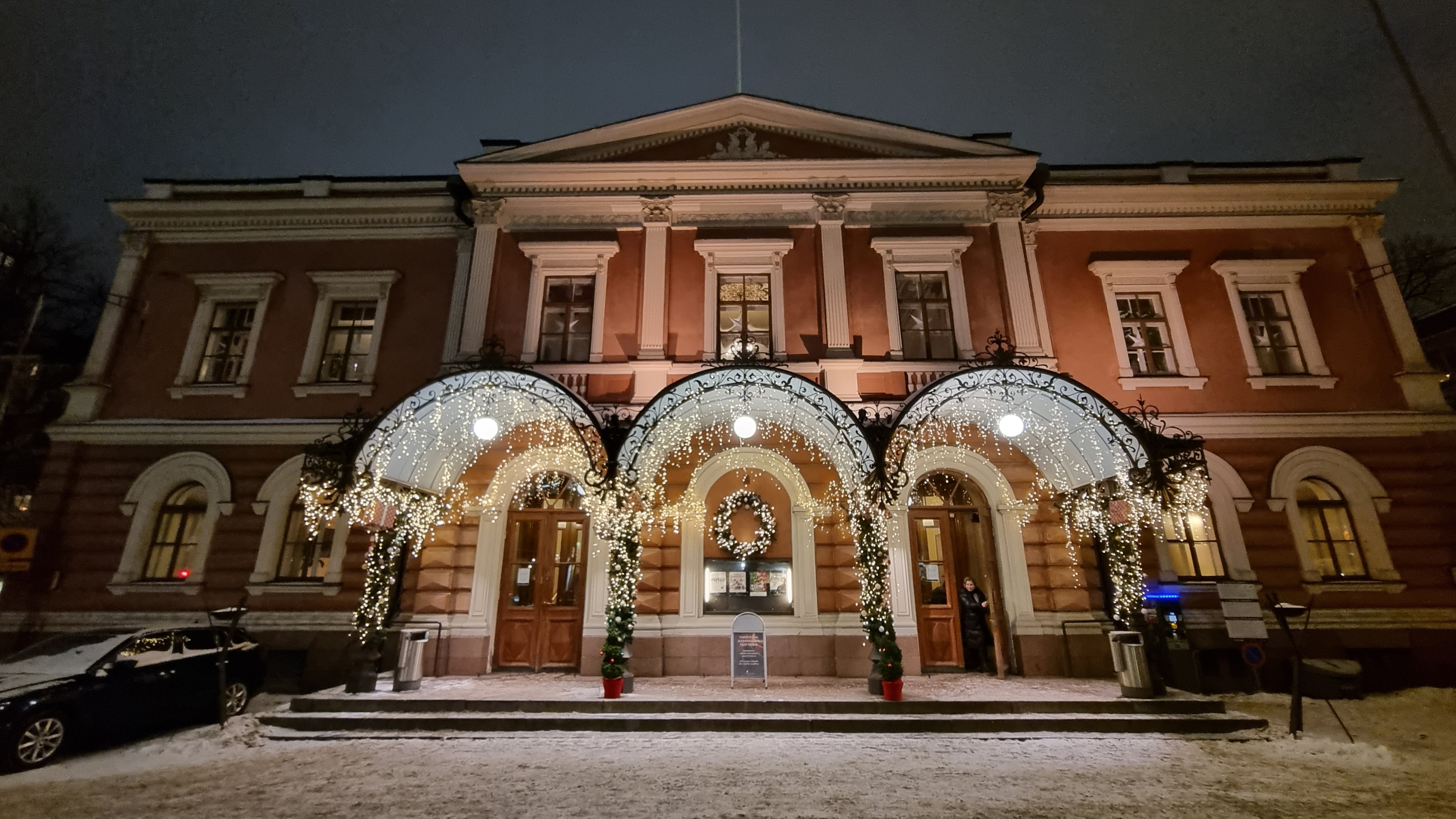
Alexander Theatre in 2024

The Alexander Theatre (Finnish: Aleksanterin teatteri; Swedish: Alexandersteatern) is a Finnish theatre in Helsinki at Bulevardi 23–27 in the neighborhood of Kamppi.

== History ==
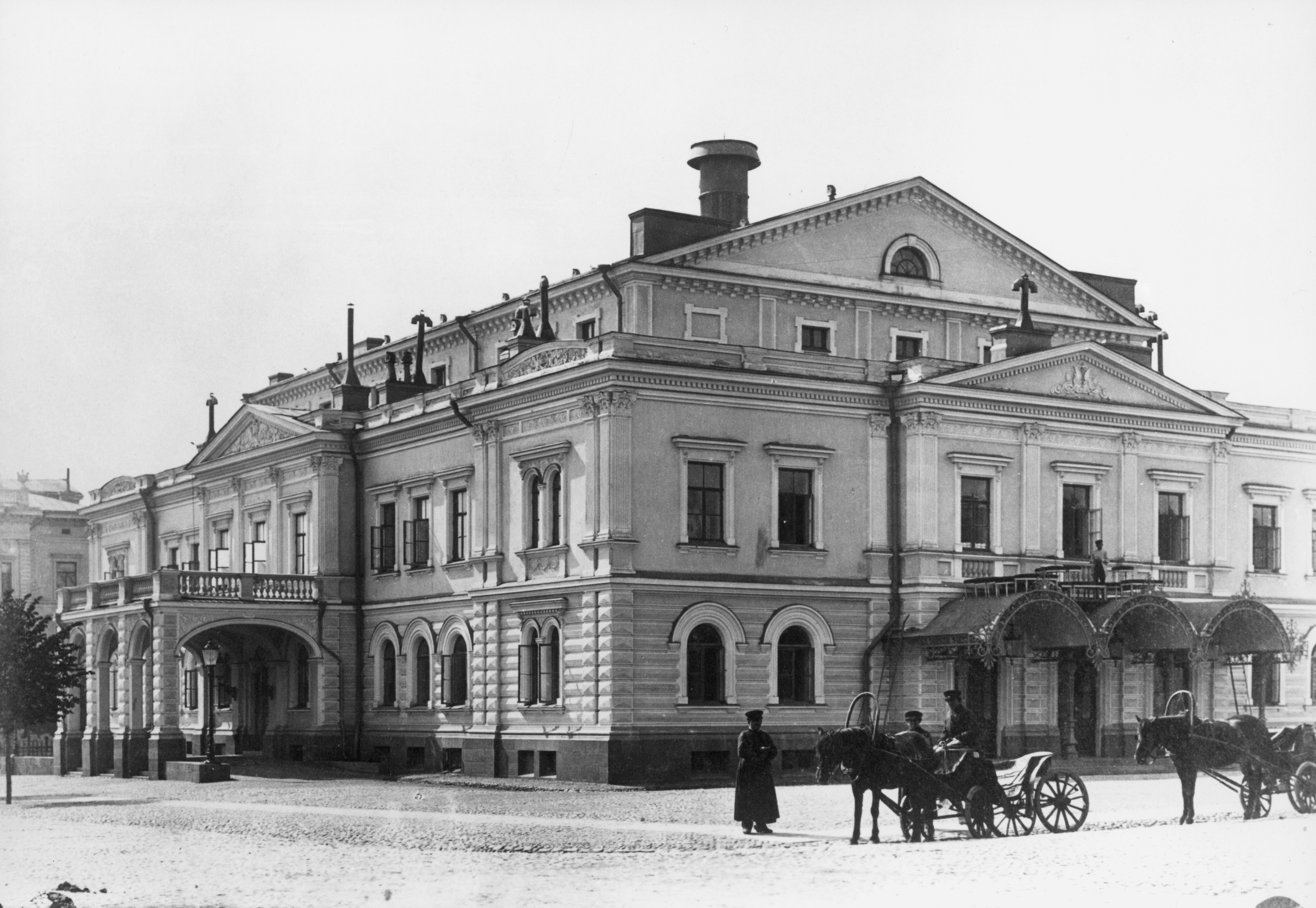
Alexander Theatre in 1880

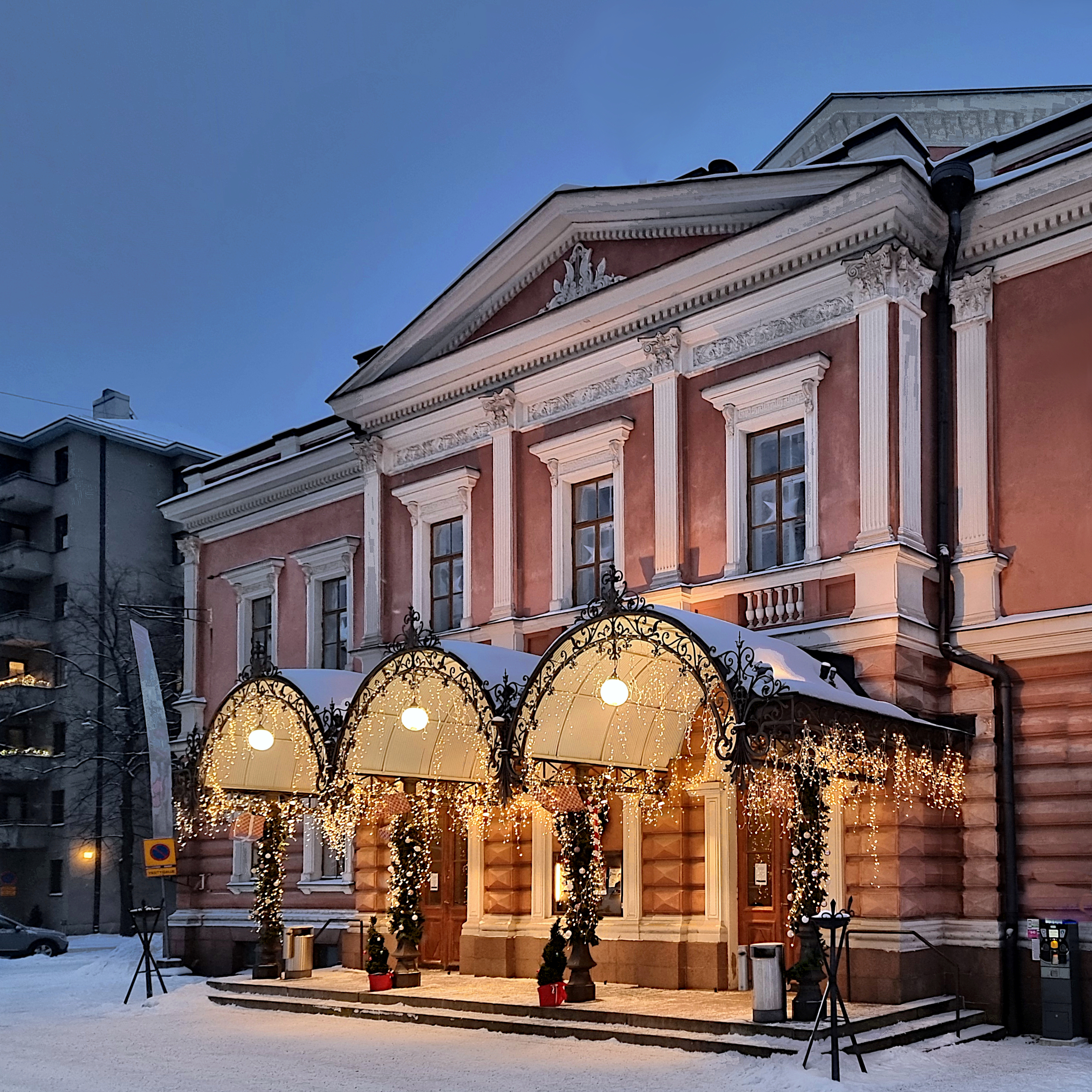
Main entrance

The theatre's official name was the Russian State Alexander Theatre of Helsinki (Gelsingforsski Russki Kazionnyi Aleksandrovski Teatr).

The grand opening occurred on 30 March 1880 with Charles Gounod's Faust.

== Modern times ==
Since 1993, the theatre has been used for guest stage performances of various genres. The complex also houses different offices, rehearsal facilities, dance studios and different companies. The theatre hosts opera, ballet, circus, drama, and dance. It has an auditorium with 500 seats and rehearsal studios.

== See also ==
- Finnish National Theatre
- Swedish Theatre
- Finnish National Opera and Ballet
- Helsinki Music Centre
- Finnish National Opera and Ballet
