= Gothenburg Opera Dance Company =

Swedish dance company

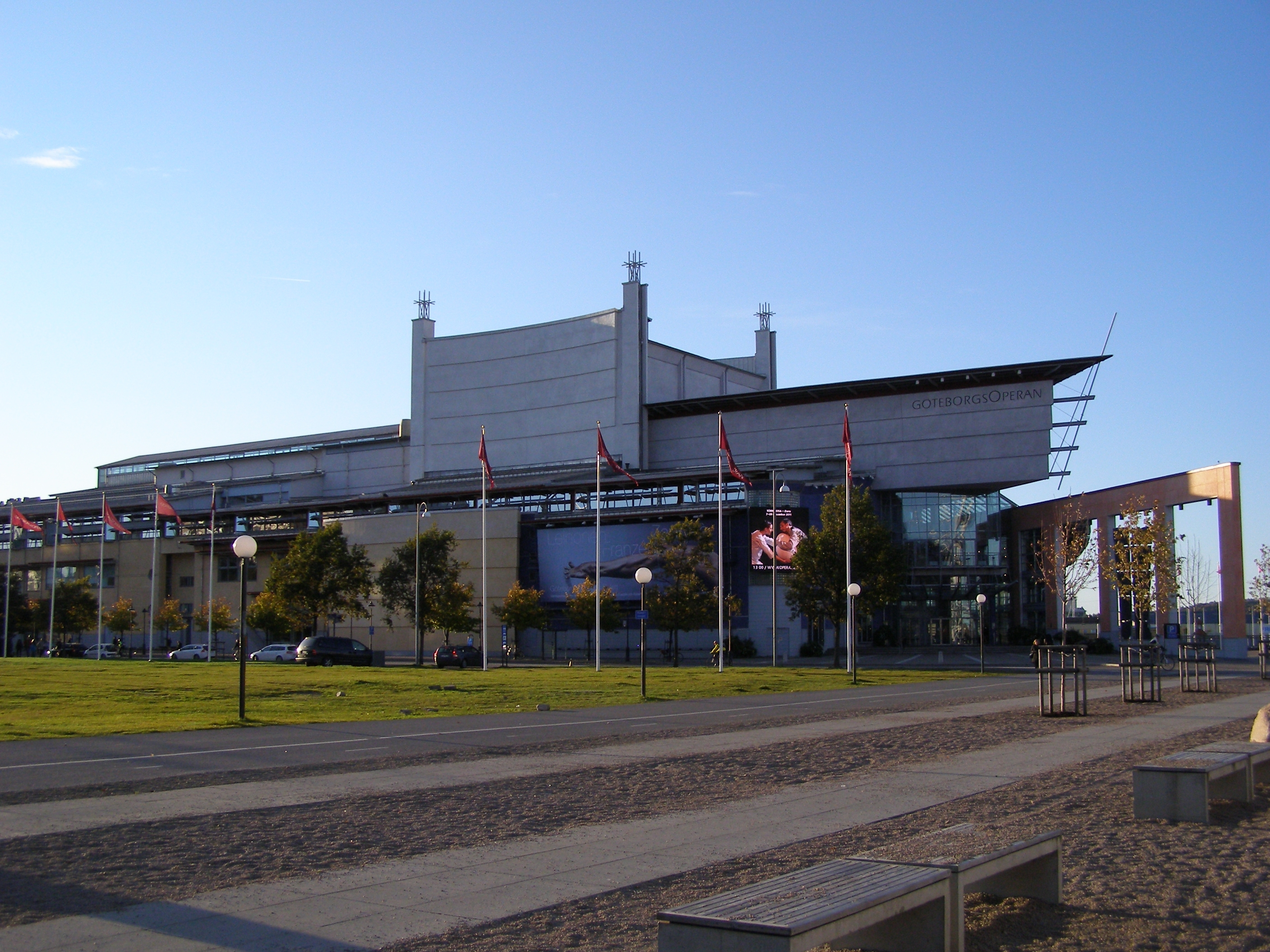
The Goteborg opera

Gothenburg Opera Dance Company (GöteborgsOperans Danskompani), formerly Göteborg Ballet, is a modern dance company based in Gothenburg, Sweden. It shares a performance space with the city's opera.

The company has recently transitioned from classical repertoire to a new focus on contemporary work. Johannes Ohman was the artistic director during this transitional period and he worked to create and sustain new relationships with innovative choreographers. The Göteborg Ballet currently has works by notable choreographers including: William Forsythe, Jirí Kylián, Ohad Naharin, Nacho Duato, Jorma Elo, Johan Inger, Kenneth Kvarnström, Alexander Ekman, Mats Ek, and Örjan Andersson. However, the Company continues to present classical ballet works such as Giselle and The Sleeping Beauty.

Adolphe Binder was appointed artistic director in August 2011, the first time a woman had been the head of the company in thirty-five years. She aspired to continue the development of her predecessor and expresses the importance of contemporary dance saying, "Dance is a microcosm of events in society and the wider world. Contemporary art will show future generations what values we used to have, what conflicts we used to deal with, and what we dreamed of."

In 2016, Katrín Hall became artistic director.
