= Alexander Ekman =

Swedish dancer and choreographer (born 1984)

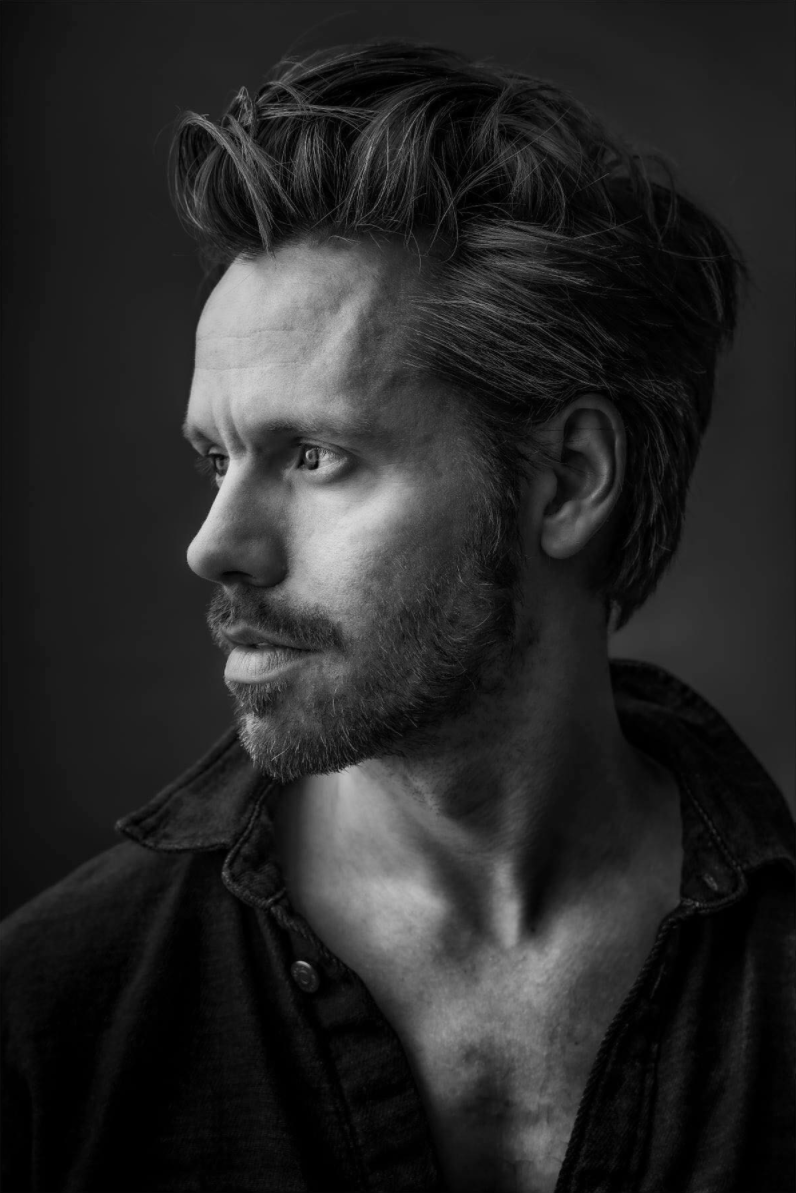
- Born: Karl Wilhelm Alexander Ekman; 1984 (age 41–42); Stockholm, Sweden
- Education: Royal Swedish Ballet
- Occupations: Choreographer, dancer

Karl Wilhelm Alexander Ekman (born 1984) is a Swedish ballet dancer and choreographer. His choreographies have been performed by Les Ballets de Monte Carlo, the Boston Ballet, Pacific Northwest Ballet, the Semperoper Ballett, the Nederlands Dans Theater, the Norwegian National Ballet, the Royal Swedish Ballet, the São Paulo City Ballet, the Sydney Dance Company, and the Wiener Staatsballett. For some of them he has designed sets and costumes or composed the music.

== Life ==
Ekman trained at the Royal Swedish Ballet school in Stockholm. At 15 he danced at Europa danse in France and discovered many international choreographers. At 16 he began his professional dance career and joined the Royal Swedish Ballet. One year later he moved to The Netherlands to join the Netherlands Dance theatre 2 in Den Haag, and after that Cullberg Ballet in Stockholm. After 5 years as a professional dancer when he was 21 he decided to become a choreographer on full-time and began his freelancing career.

== Work ==
He was a host of the Swedish radio program Sommar in 2015. In 2013 he received an Olivier Award nomination for his choreography of the original work Cacti. His other notable works include Tyll, A Swan Lake, and Episode 31.

Ekman trained at the Royal Swedish Ballet School from 1994 to 2001. He danced at the Royal Swedish Opera from 2001 to 2002 and then at the Nederlands Dans Theater II from 2002 to 2005. He danced for the Cullberg Ballet from 2005 to 2006, where he made his debut as a choreographer.

In 2006, when he was 22, he wrote “Flockwork” for the Netherlands Dance Theatre. He has created around 50 pieces for dance companies around the world. In 2008 Ekman collaborated with Swedish Choreographer Mats Ek at the Stads Theatre in Stockholm. He created video content for the play Hållplats.

His work “Cacti” (2010) has been performed by 20 dance companies worldwide. After struggling with becoming reviewed in public, Ekman decided to create a piece about opinions and our need to criticize each other. A comment on the “high browed snobbish art world”. In 2012 Ekman began his collaboration with Swedish Composer Mikael Karlsson. Together they have created around 8 pieces together. Including “A swan lake”, “Midsummer night's dream”, “COW” and “PLAY”.

Ekman created A Swan Lake in 2014 but this time in his own version. It received a lot of response from around the world. He filled 6000 liters of water at stage which created a real lake. In 2015 Ekman created Midsummer night's dream in his own version at the Royal Swedish Ballet which became an instant hit with the audience and critics. Later this production was captured and showed on both Swedish and French national TV. In 2017 Ekman created “KREATIV” together with Swedish Production Company “Anna and Paul”. This is A documentary / study interviewing scientists, artists and creators. The documentary was broadcast on Swedish National Television (SVT) as well as the San Francisco Dance film festival in 2018. Ekman Created “PLAY” for The Paris Opera Ballet in 2017. It is a full evening work which played for 25 sold-out performances in December 2017 at the famous Garnier Opera in Paris. PLAY has also been captured for the Screen and broadcast on Swedish Television.

In 2018, he danced his own choreography in Thoughts on Bergman at the Théâtre des Champs-Élysées in Paris.

In 2024 Alexander Ekman was chosen to be the Artistic Director and Choreographer of the opening ceremony for the Paralympic games in Paris.

In May 2025, he collaborated with the champagne brand Dom Pérignon for a campaign named "Creation is an Eternal Journey".

== Choreography ==
=== A Swan Lake ===
A Swan Lake is a full-length work created by Ekman. It is created for The Norwegian National Opera & Ballet. Ekman created it together with Henrik Vibskov. The music is composed by Mikael Karlsson. Ekman created A Swan Lake on stage with company by filling the stage with 5,000 liters of water.

=== Midsummer Night's Dream ===
Midsummer Night's Dream ballet was choreographed by Alexander Ekman in 2015 and directed by Mikael Jönsson. The music was created by Mikael Karlsson. Ekman created it for the Royal Swedish Ballet inspired by the customary Swedish Midsummer Eve festival. It has been described as a free interpretation of Shakespeare's play.

=== COW ===
COW is another ballet by Ekman. It features eleven successive scenes. In this ballet Ekman related human behavior in everyday life to the behavior of Cows. It is composed by Mikael Karlsson. Cow is choreographed by Alexander Ekman himself. Music was created by Mikael Karlsson, costumes by Henrik Vibskov, light by Fabio Antoci video by TM Rives.

=== PLAY ===
Ekman created 'PLAY' together with Karlsson which creates a unique bond between dance and music. Play was created for the Paris Opera Ballet. It is a dance music theatre piece that recalls the age of childhood. It is written and directed by Ekman himself.

=== Cacti ===
Ekman created Cacti in 2010. It is one of the successful pieces. In Cacti 16 dancers together creates rhythms. In 2010, Queen Beatrix of the Netherlands gave Cacti as a gift to the royalties of Norway on a state visit in Oslo. In 2010 it was nominated for best new dance production for Swan award in Netherlands.

== Awards ==
- Medea Award – Inventor of the year – Midsummer Night's dream. 2015
- National Dance award UK 2010
- Zwaan Awards Netherlands (nominated) – Cacti 2010
- The Birgit Cullberg Scholarship 2015
- The Swedish Såstaholm Award 2015
- The Faust Award – COW – Germany 2016
