= Yuval Pick =

Israeli choreographer

- יובל פיק
- Born: 1970 (age 54–55); Petach Tikvah, Israël
- Education: Bat Dor Dance School
- Occupation(s): Choreographer, director of the CCN of Rillieux-la-Pape
- Organization: National Choreographic Center of Rillieux-la-Pape
- Style: Contemporary dance

Yuval Pick (Hebrew: יובל פיק; born 1970) is a choreographer and the director of the National Choreographic Center (Centre Chorégraphique National) of Rillieux-la-Pape (France).

== Biography ==
Appointed director of the National Choreographic Center of Rillieux-la-Pape in France in August 2011, Yuval Pick has a long career as a choreographer, a dancer and a teacher.

He first trained at the Bat-Dor Dance school in Tel Aviv, then joined the Batsheva Dance Company in 1991. Four years later he left to begin working as an international guest artist with, among others, Tero Saarinen, Carolyn Carlson and Russel Maliphant.

In 1999 he joined the Opera Ballet of Lyon, and founded his own company, The Guests, in 2002. Since then he has created a strong repertory of works marked by their elaborated, layered movement vocabulary, accompanied by commissioned scores by ranking composers.

In his work the relationships between individuals and group(s) are often highlighted and challenged. He created Popular Music (2005), Strand Behind (2006) for the Agora Festival of IRCAM and the Junior Ballet of the National Conservatory of music and dance in Lyon, /Paon/ (2008) for the Junior Ballet of Geneva and17 drops. In 2010, he created Score, then The Him for the Junior Ballet of the National Conservatory of music and dance in Paris and the trio PlayBach at the invitation of Carolyn Carlson. In 2012, No play hero, around the music of David Lang and Folks for the "Biennale de la Danse" in Lyon. The, two creations in 2014, the duet loom around the music of Nico Muhly and Ply for 5 dancers with the American composer Ashley Fure. In 2015 he created Apnée (corps vocal) for 4 dancers and 6 singers in collaboration with Spirito, "les Chœurs et solistes de Lyon — Bernard Tétu".

== Main choreographies ==
- 1997 : Kvedim, which won a prize at the Gvanim Festival of Tel Aviv
- 1998 : Nice for a White Wedding
- 2002 : solo Cotton Crown for the Venice Biennale
- 2004 : Le Sacre for the Ballet de Lorraine
- 2005 : Popular Music
- 2006 : Strand Behind
- 2007 : Look White Inside
- 2008 : 17 Drops
- 2008 : solo Living in Pieces for the Biennale de la danse de Lyon
- 2008 : /Paon/ for the Junior Ballet of Genève
- 2010 : Score
- 2010 : PlayBach
- 2012 : No Play Hero
- 2012 : Folks
- 2014 : loom
- 2014 : Ply
- 2015 : Apnée (corps vocal)
- 2015 : eddies
- 2015 : Are Friends Electric?
