= Carolyn Carlson (artist) =

American dancer and choreographer

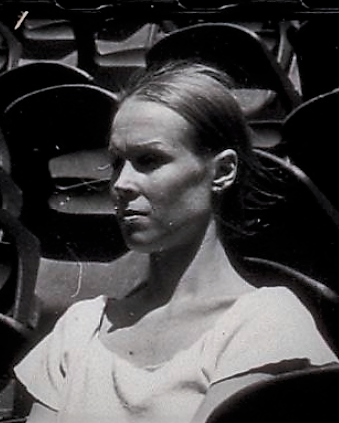
- Born: March 7, 1943 (age 83)
- Education: San Francisco School of Ballet; University of Utah

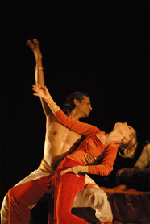
Carolyn Carlson and Raghunath Manet performing

Carolyn Carlson (born 7 March 1943) is an American born French nationalized contemporary dance choreographer, performer, and poet. She is of Finnish descent.

She is the director of the Centre Chorégraphique National in Roubaix and of the Atelier de Paris at La Cartoucherie de Vincennes in Paris. Carlson was awarded the title of Chevalier des Arts et des Lettres of the French Republic.

== Career ==
She initially studied dance at the San Francisco School of Ballet and at the University of Utah. In 1965 she joined the Alwin Nikolaïs dance company in New York becoming an outstanding dancer of the company.

In 1968 she won the International Dance Festival in Paris as Best Dancer (Meilleur Danseur).

In 1971, she joined the Anne Béranger dance company and in 1972 she presented Rituel pour un rêve mort at the Avignon Festival. Successively she was invited to join the London School of Contemporary Dance as an instructor, performer and choreographer.

In 1974 she met Rolf Liebermann and was invited to join the Paris Opera as a choreographer.

In 1975 she directed the Groupe de Recherches Théâtrales (GRTOP). Creations of this period include Density 21,5; The Architects; This, that and the other; Slow, heavy and blue. Beginning 1974 she taught her improvisation and composition techniques in masterclasses held at the rotonde of the Opéra.

In 1980 she was at the 'Teatro la Fenice' in Venice. Works of this period include Undici Onde; Underwood; Blue Lady.

In 1985 she was back in Paris where she performed at the 'Théâtre de la Ville' presenting Dark; Still Waters and other works.

In 1991–1992 she was in Finland (Elokuu; Syyskuu; Maa). She also directed the Cullberg Ballet of Stockholm for two years (Sub Rosa).

She presented several solo choreographies such as Blue Lady (1984), Vu d'ici (1995). Other works include choreographies for dancers such as Nina Hyvärinen, Talia Paz, Marie-Claude Pietragalla, Tero Saarinen.

In 1998, she won the Prix Benois de la Danse as choreographer.

She was the director of the Dance sector of the Venice Biennale (Biennale Danza - Venice, Italy) from 1999 to 2002. Works there include Parabola (1999), Light Bringers (2000), J. Beuys Song (2001), Writings on water (2002). In Venice she opened the contemporary dance academy Accademia Isola Danza and created a festival.

She has performed in improvisations with artists such as Larrio Ekson, Jorma Uotinen, Malou Airaudo, and with musicians such as Michel Portal, John Surman, René Aubry, Joachim Kuhn, Trilok Gurtu, Lubomyr Melnyk.

She creates repertory pieces for the Paris opera (Signes), Opéra de Bordeaux (Hydrogen Jukebox).

== Timeline ==
- 1965–1971 – Leading figure in the Alwin Nikolais company
- 1974–1980 – Etoile-Chorégraphe at the Paris Opera Ballet (GRTOP)
- 1980–1984 – Artistic Director of the Teatro La Fenice, Venice
- 1985–1991 – Resident Artist at the Théâtre de la Ville, Paris
- 1991–1992 – Resident Artist at the Helsinki City Theater and the Finnish National Ballet
- 1994–1995 – Artistic Director of the Cullberg Ballet, Stockholm
- 1999–2002 – Artistic Director of the dance section of the Venice Biennale
- Since 1999 – Artistic director of the Atelier de Paris - Carolyn Carlson, Master classes centre
- Since 2004 – Artistic Director of the National Choreographic Centre of Roubaix Nord-Pas de Calais
- Since 2014 - Creation of the Carolyn Carlson Company, in residence at the Théâtre National de Chaillot – Paris
