= Finnish National Ballet =

Professional ballet company at the Finnish National Opera

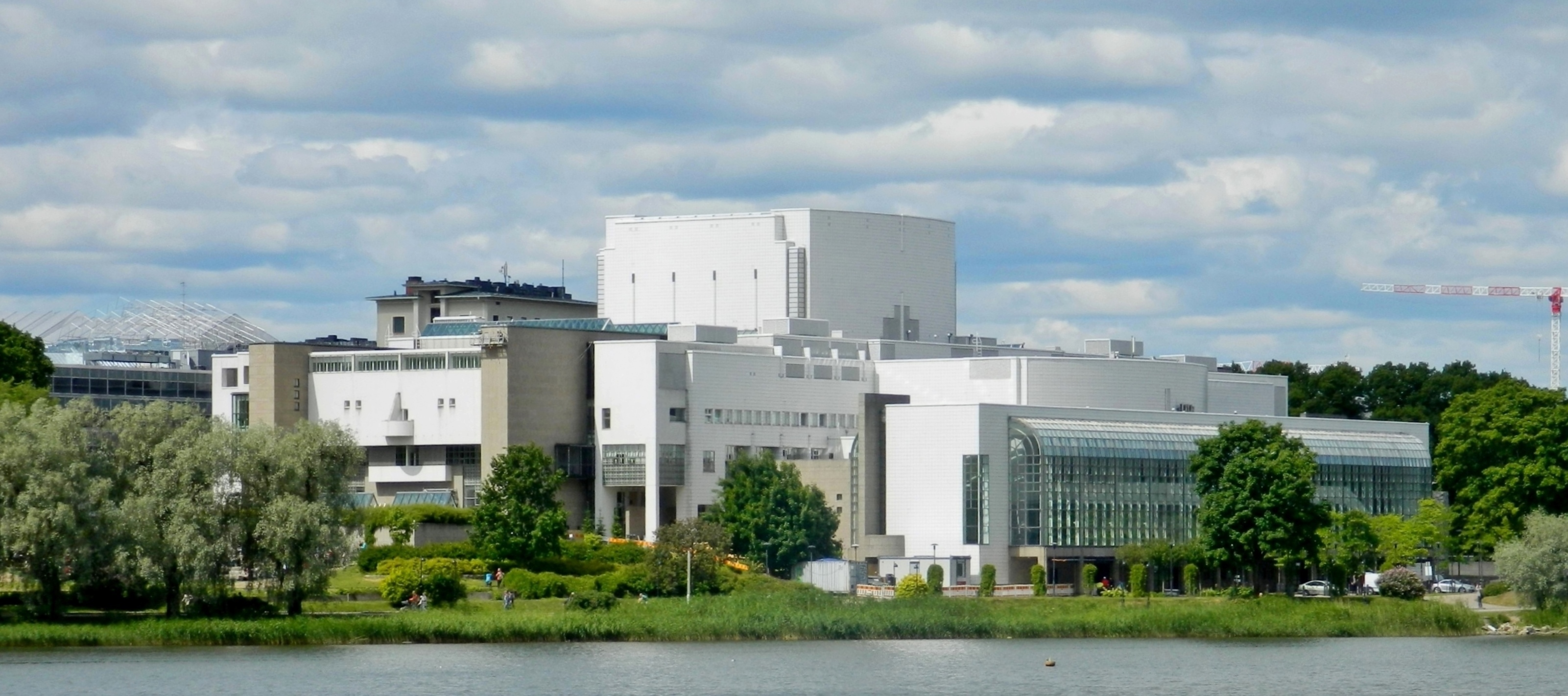

General information
- Name: Finnish National Ballet
- Year founded: 1922
- Principal venue: Finnish National Opera and Ballet, Helsinki, Finland
- Website: www.oopperabaletti.fi/en/

Senior staff
- Director: Madeleine Onne

Other
- Associated schools: Ballet School of the Finnish National Opera and Ballet

Finnish National Ballet (Finnish: Suomen Kansallisbaletti) is a professional ballet company at the Finnish National Opera, in Helsinki, Finland. The company was founded in 1922 and it currently employs 73 dancers. It is the only Finnish company that regularly performs a classical ballet repertoire. The current director Madeleine Onne started with the company in 2018, after Kenneth Greve, (2008–2018), Dinna Bjørn (2001–2008) and Jorma Uotinen (1992–2001).

Ballet School of the Finnish National Opera and Ballet works in close association with the National Ballet. The school has 30 secondary education places for training professional dancers, and 150 basic arts pupils (young students).
