= Jorma Uotinen =

Finnish dancer, singer and choreographer

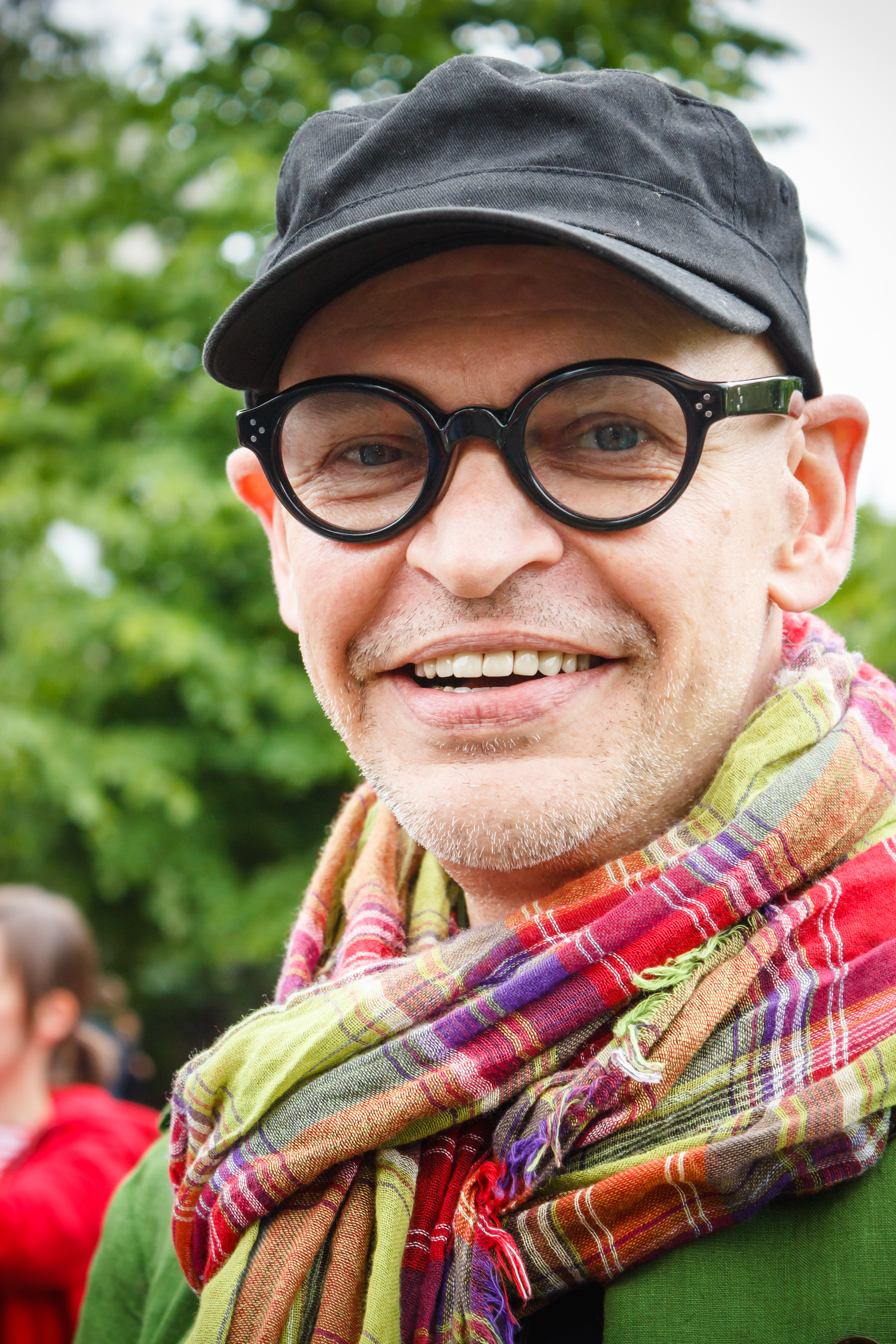
Jorma Uotinen

Jorma Leo Kalevi Uotinen (born 28 June 1950 in Pori) is a Finnish dancer, singer and choreographer. As a dancer and choreographer, Uotinen has worked both in many dance groups, both in and outside of Finland, since 1970. He has received many Finnish and international awards and honours in his career.

== Career ==
He was a dancer with the Finnish National Ballet 1970–1976, and in 1976 he was invited by director Carolyn Carlson to join the Groupe de recherche Theatrales at l'Opera de Paris, where he worked until 1980. He has worked as artistic director in the Helsinki City Theatre dance group (1987–1990), at the Finnish National Ballet (1992–2001) and the Kuopio Dance Festival (2000–). He has successfully made use of his international connections in directing these institutions, e.g. by inviting Sylvie Guillem to stage her version of Giselle at the Finnish National Ballet in 1998.

After an active career as a dancer, Uotinen has moved to perform by singing.

Uotinen is a judge of Tanssii tähtien kanssa, the Finnish version of Dancing With the Stars.

Uotinen is bisexual. He was in a relationship with Finnish singer Helena Lindgren whom he lived with for almost 20 years.

Uotinen is UNICEF ambassador of good will. In 2007, he was a voiceover actor in Rottatouille, the Finnish version of Ratatouille.

== Productions ==
- Sami & Jorma, podcast 2024
- Möröt vastaan muukalaiset (Galaksarin ääninäyttelijä), 2009
- Black Water, Skånesin Tanssiteatteri 2009
- Ruska, PDC 2009
- Piaf Piaf, Barka-teatteri 2008
- Rottatouille (Skinnerin ääninäyttelijä), 2007
- Kevätuhri, Tanskan Kuninkaallinen baletti 2007
- Colours, Suomen Kansallisbaletti 2006
- Jord, Tanskan Kuninkaallinen baletti 2006
- Sentimental Secrets, Konsertti 2005
- Pateettinen baletti, Firenzen Ooppera 2005
- J'ai peur d'aimer/Pelkään rakastaa, Konsertti 2004
- Avanto, Grand Theatre de Geneve 2003
- La Chute de Cheval, Introtanssi 2003
- Svansjö2, Ooppera 2002
- So-called Carmen, Introdans 2001
- Tulips, Introdans 2001
- Baldur, Islantilainen baletti 2000
- Uni, Introdans 2000
- Evankeliumi, Suomen kansanbaletti 1999
- Man who never was, solotyö 1998
- Halla 1995
- Petrushka, Finnish National Ballet 1994
- Kaapeli, Finnish National Ballet 1993
- La Diva, solo work 1991
- Ballet Pathetique, Helsinki City Theatre 1989
- Piaf Piaf, Helsinki City Theatre 1989
- B12, solo for Tero Saarinen 1988
- Uhri, Finnish National Ballet 1986
- Reves glaces, Opera de Paris (G.R.C.O.P) 1986
- Atem, Teatro La Scala Milano 1985
- Kalevala, Helsingin kaupunginteatteri Helsinki 1985
- Anonyymit, Helsingin kaupunginteatteri Helsinki 1984
- Anonyymit, Teatro La Fenice Venetsia 1984
- Black ink on white paper, Collage dansgrupp Oslo 1984
- Bambola, Teatterikorkeakoulu Helsinki 1984
- Peter Pan, Helsingin kaupunginteatteri Helsinki 1984
- Huuto, Studio-galleria Julius Helsinki 1984
- Askeleet, Helsingin kaupunginteatteri Helsinki 1983
- Chicago, Helsingin kaupunginteatteri Helsinki 1983
- Locked doors, 1983
- Pierrot Lunaire, Teatro La Scala Milano 1983
- Julius Almeria, Studio-galleria Julius Helsinki 1983
- Orfeus ja Eurydike, Teatro La Fenice Venetsia 1982
- Orlando, Paladino Theater an der Wien Wien 1982
- Unisono, Helsingin kaupunginteatteri Helsinki 1982
- Loputon arvoitus, Helsingin kaupunginteatteri Helsinki 1982
- Unohdettu horisontti, Helsingin juhlaviikot Helsinki 1980
- Paljastusten aakkoset, Tanssiteatteri Rollo Helsinki 1979
- Jojo, Theatre Bouffes du Nord Pariisi 1979
- Aspekteja, Suomen kansallisooppera Helsinki 1974

== Filmography ==
- Le Café de Mes Souvenirs 2021
