= Östersund =

Östersund Staare (Southern Sami)
- City
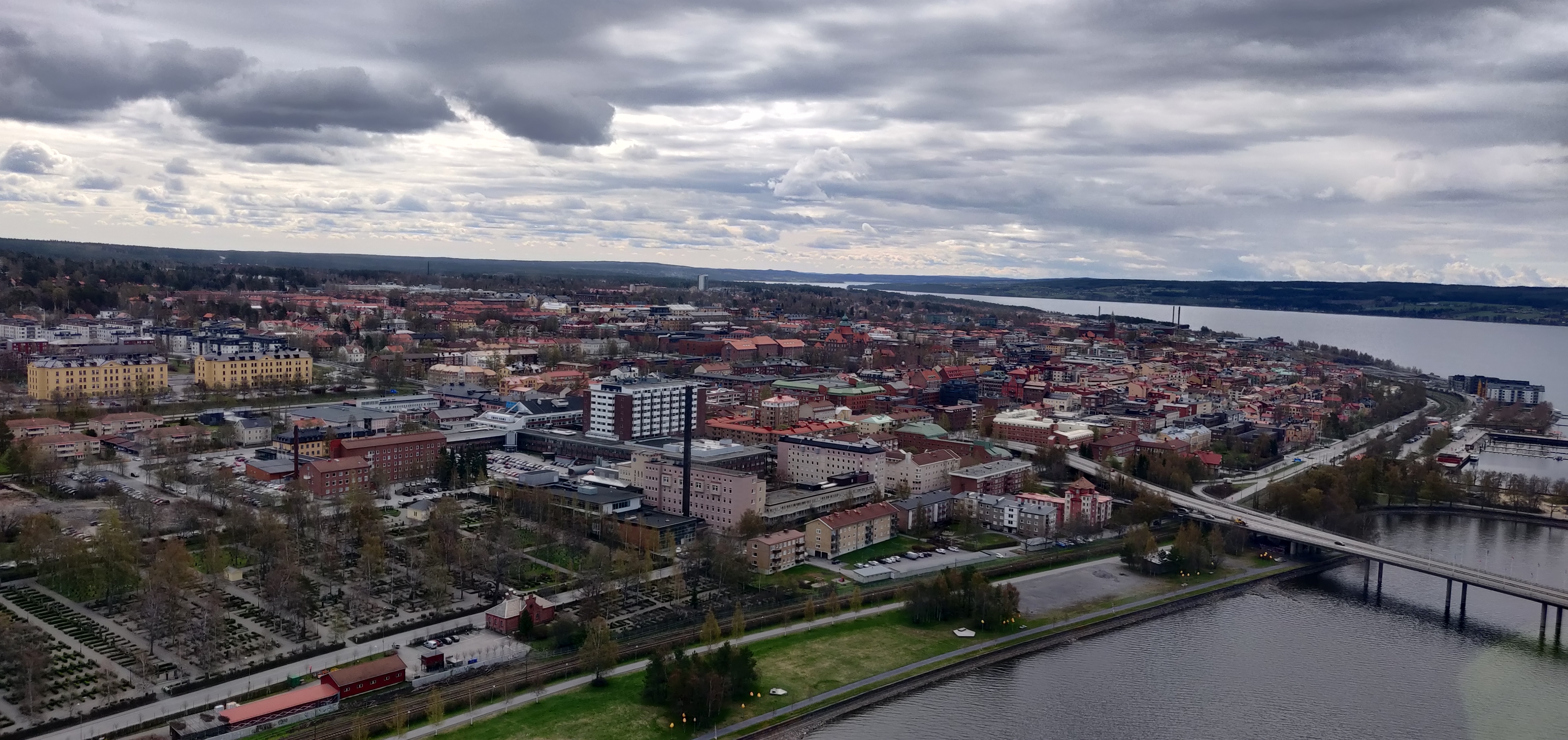
- Östersund in May 2021

- Flag Coat of arms
- Nickname: Centre of Sweden
- Motto: Vinterstaden (Winter City)
- Location within Jämtland Location within Sweden
- Coordinates: 63°10′45″N 14°38′09″E
- Country: Sweden
- Province: Jämtland
- County: Jämtland County
- Municipality: Östersund Municipality and Krokom Municipality
- Became town: 23 October 1991

Area
  - City: 27.28 km^{2} (10.53 sq mi)
  - Metro: 2,220.50 km^{2} (857.34 sq mi)
- Elevation: 312 m (1,024 ft)

Population (31 December 2015)
  - City: 49,806
  - Density: 1,625/km^{2} (4,210/sq mi)
  - Metro: 76,410
- Demonym: Östersundare
- Time zone: UTC+1 (CET)
  - Summer (DST): UTC+2 (CEST)
- Postal code: 831 xx
- Area code: (+46) 63
- Website: www.ostersund.se

Östersund (pronounced [œstɛˈʂɵnːd]; Southern Sami: Staare) is an urban area (city) in Jämtland in northern Sweden. It is the seat of Östersund Municipality and the capital of Jämtland County. Östersund is located at the shores of Sweden's fifth-largest lake, Storsjön, opposite the island Frösön. It is the only city in Jämtland. The northern part of the urban area is located inside of the municipality of Krokom.

Östersund is the region's cultural and economical centre and by tradition a city of trade and commerce. The city had one of the most extensive garrisons in Sweden prior to its closure in the early 21st century. Östersund is home to Mid Sweden University's largest campus site with approximately 7,000 students. With a total population of 50,960 (2017) Östersund is the 22nd most populous city in Sweden, the 46th most populous city in Scandinavia, and by far the largest inland city in Northern Sweden.

The city was the only Swedish city founded and chartered in the 18th century. Östersund was founded in order to create a trade monopoly over Jämtland whose inhabitants' lucrative trade annoyed the Swedish Crown. The intention was to persuade the local farmers to deliver merchandise to middlemen in Östersund, but the population opposed this economic philosophy, and Östersund long remained small. It took until the end of the 19th century for Östersund to truly become a city, after the arrival of the railroad and the economic liberalization of that time.

Östersund is situated in inland Scandinavia and connected to Sundsvall in the east on the Swedish coast, and Trondheim in the west at the shores of the Norwegian Sea. Östersund is located in the middle of Scandinavia, in the middle of Sweden, in the middle of Jämtland County and in the middle of Östersund Municipality. As the most centrally located city in Sweden, the city credits itself as the centre of Sweden.

Östersund is marketed as Vinterstaden – Winter City. Winter City as a project is run by the municipality together with city enterprises. While winters are long, the local climate is only moderately cold by elevated and northerly Swedish standards, but with chilly summers. Östersund has had a long history as a centre of outdoor activities with a modern cross-country ski stadium and an actual piste in the city itself. Östersund has also hosted several World Championships in various sports such as biathlon, speed skating and ski orienteering along with Swedish National Championships in cross-country skiing and snocross. The city has been the applicant city of Sweden for several Winter Olympic Games, but has yet to host one. The precursor to the Winter Olympic Games, the Nordic Games, were however held at several occasions in the city, due to lack of snow in Stockholm.

== Geography ==
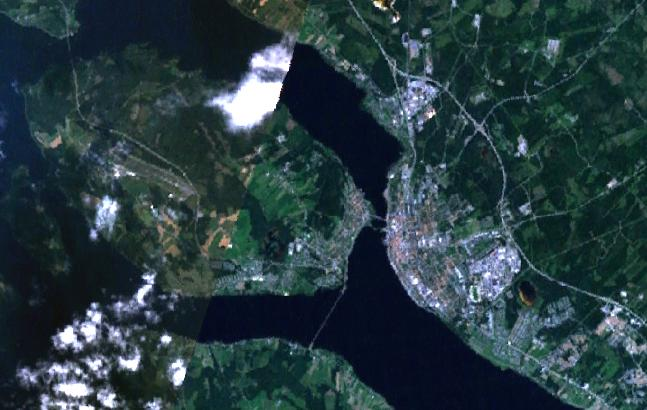
Satellite image of Östersund and the island of Frösön.

Östersund is the only city in the province and is located on the shore of Storsjön, the fifth largest lake in Sweden. The area surrounding this lake is commonly referred to as Storsjöbygden and has been described as the world's northernmost located genuine agricultural society in the inland with continental climate.

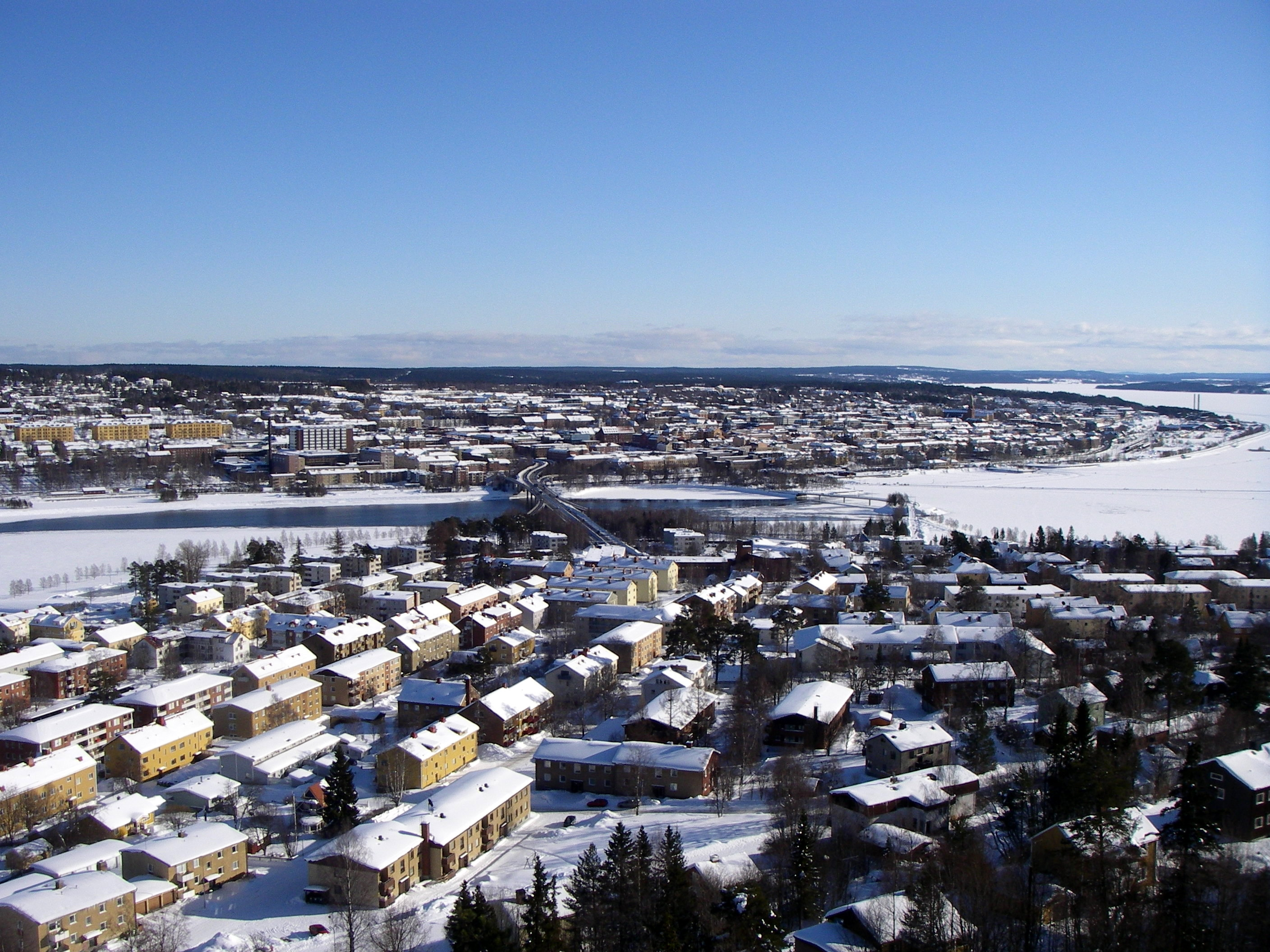
Östersund and Frösön in February 2005

The city sprawls along the eastern slopes of lake Storsjön with most of the city, and the city core itself, located on the mainland, facing the non mainland part of the city, the island of Frösön, which for a very long time was the actual centre of Jämtland. Today, a sizeable part of the city's population live on the slopes of the island that face the city centre. Östersund is a bimunicipal town because a minor part of it, with roughly 400 inhabitants, is actually situated in Krokom Municipality.

The city spans across Östersundet and the city was named after this strait. Östersund can be directly translated from Swedish to English as "East Sound". The name of the strait derives from an older Jamtish name now present in the form Åstersånn.

=== Climate ===
Östersund has a subarctic climate (Köppen: Dfc) and is located in the far north of the north temperate climate zone. The cold Arctic winds that occasionally find their way to the city are called nordvästan ('the north-westerner') or kallvästan ('the cold-westerner') locally.

The winter climate is much warmer than most locations at similar latitudes. This is due to the Gulf Stream and the many passages in the mountain range, bringing warmer Atlantic winds to the city during winters. This somewhat maritime character also makes the summers in the city rather cool, in comparison to other towns in inland Scandinavia, which all have a more continental climate with cold winters and warm summers. It contains a strong influence of the humid continental climate (Dfb) courtesy of its mild September lows extending the mild mean temperatures.

Though Östersund is in fact affected by the Gulf Stream, it lacks the high frequency of rain or snow following the currents. This is due to the Scandinavian Mountain Range acting as a natural barrier, receiving most of the precipitation, giving Östersund and the surrounding area a rain deficit. Another issue that has to be taken into account is the higher elevation of Östersund compared to the weather stations in Ångermanland farther east. For example, Sollefteå at a similar latitude 130 kilometres (81 mi) to the east but near sea level in an inland valley, has three degrees warmer July days. There is often temperature inversion between Östersund and lower areas in winter.

Östersund has a high exposition of sunlight and was the sunniest city in Sweden in the summer of 2007 (1 July to 9 August) with 654 hours of sun. However, in comparison to east coast locations, sunshine is relatively low.

Climate data for Åre Östersund Airport (Frösön), 2002–2020; precipitation in Tullus 2002–2020; extremes since 1901
Month	Jan	Feb	Mar	Apr	May	Jun	Jul	Aug	Sep	Oct	Nov	Dec	Year
Record high °C (°F)	9.8 (49.6)	10.3 (50.5)	17.8 (64.0)	20.5 (68.9)	26.6 (79.9)	32.0 (89.6)	33.0 (91.4)	31.7 (89.1)	25.0 (77.0)	19.7 (67.5)	12.2 (54.0)	10.8 (51.4)	33.0 (91.4)
Mean maximum °C (°F)	5.0 (41.0)	4.9 (40.8)	8.1 (46.6)	15.0 (59.0)	21.8 (71.2)	24.7 (76.5)	26.4 (79.5)	24.6 (76.3)	19.2 (66.6)	12.8 (55.0)	8.2 (46.8)	5.9 (42.6)	27.5 (81.5)
Mean daily maximum °C (°F)	−2.9 (26.8)	−2.2 (28.0)	1.4 (34.5)	7.2 (45.0)	12.6 (54.7)	16.8 (62.2)	19.5 (67.1)	17.9 (64.2)	12.8 (55.0)	6.3 (43.3)	1.1 (34.0)	−1.0 (30.2)	7.5 (45.4)
Daily mean °C (°F)	−5.9 (21.4)	−5.2 (22.6)	−2.1 (28.2)	3.2 (37.8)	8.2 (46.8)	12.5 (54.5)	15.3 (59.5)	14.1 (57.4)	9.8 (49.6)	4.0 (39.2)	−1.1 (30.0)	−3.7 (25.3)	4.1 (39.4)
Mean daily minimum °C (°F)	−8.8 (16.2)	−8.2 (17.2)	−5.6 (21.9)	−0.8 (30.6)	3.8 (38.8)	8.2 (46.8)	11.1 (52.0)	10.3 (50.5)	6.7 (44.1)	1.6 (34.9)	−3.3 (26.1)	−6.3 (20.7)	0.7 (33.3)
Mean minimum °C (°F)	−20.9 (−5.6)	−20.4 (−4.7)	−16.4 (2.5)	−7.2 (19.0)	−1.8 (28.8)	2.7 (36.9)	6.1 (43.0)	5.0 (41.0)	1.1 (34.0)	−5.3 (22.5)	−10.6 (12.9)	−16.8 (1.8)	−24.6 (−12.3)
Record low °C (°F)	−38.0 (−36.4)	−34.6 (−30.3)	−32.5 (−26.5)	−22.0 (−7.6)	−9.0 (15.8)	−3.0 (26.6)	−1.5 (29.3)	−0.8 (30.6)	−5.2 (22.6)	−17.7 (0.1)	−25.2 (−13.4)	−38.1 (−36.6)	−38.1 (−36.6)
Average precipitation mm (inches)	32.1 (1.26)	20.6 (0.81)	22.2 (0.87)	23.0 (0.91)	48.1 (1.89)	62.3 (2.45)	76.3 (3.00)	80.9 (3.19)	55.1 (2.17)	44.1 (1.74)	33.5 (1.32)	36.0 (1.42)	534.2 (21.03)
Average extreme snow depth cm (inches)	39 (15)	47 (19)	46 (18)	27 (11)	1 (0.4)	0 (0)	0 (0)	0 (0)	0 (0)	7 (2.8)	17 (6.7)	30 (12)	56 (22)
Mean monthly sunshine hours	30	70	150	202	244	259	257	208	127	83	40	22	1,692
Source 1: SMHI Temperature Data
Source 2: SMHI Precipitation

== Cityscape ==
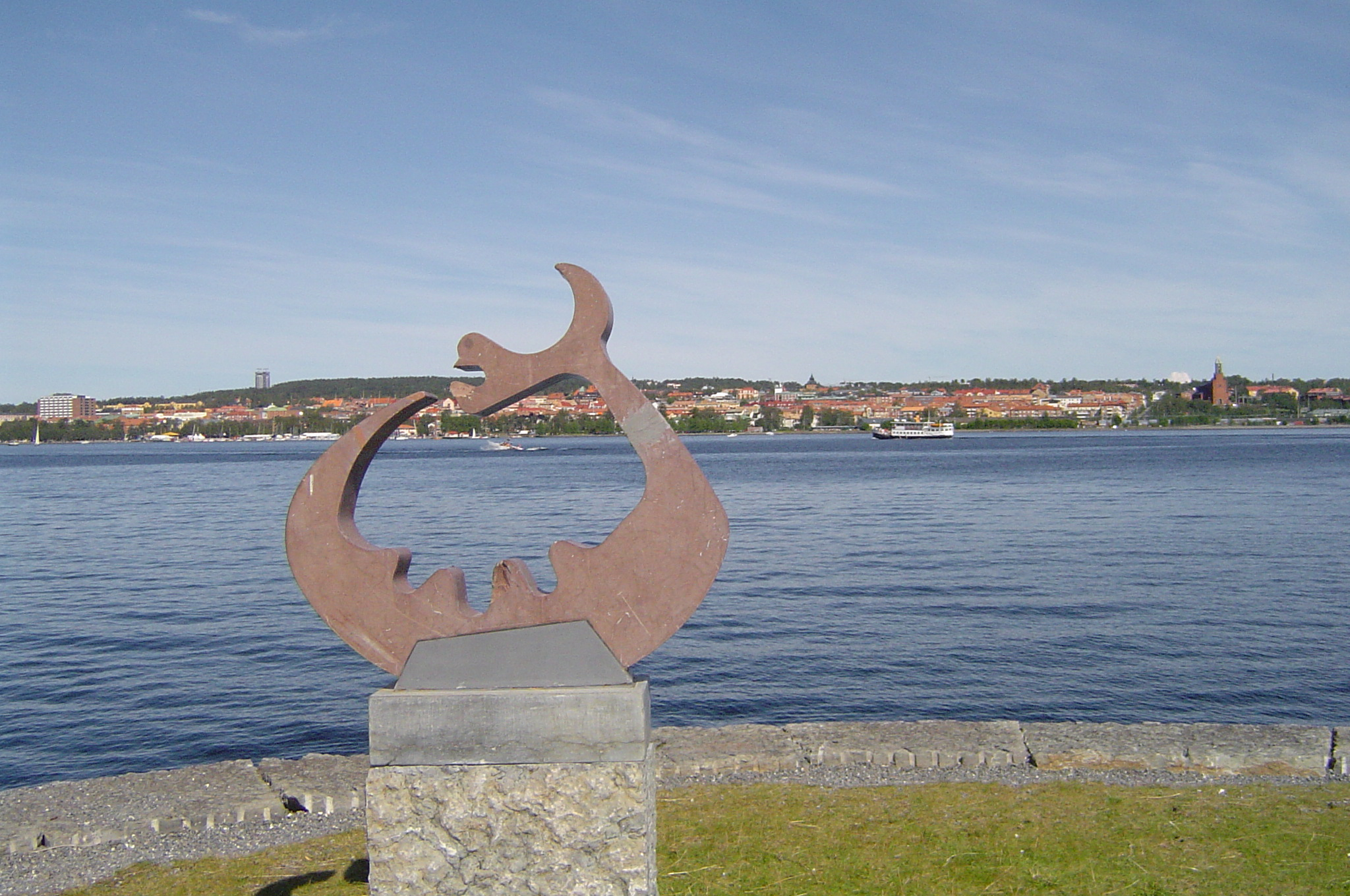
Storsjöodjuret (the Great lake monster) is a cryptid said to inhabit lake Storsjön. This figure has often been used as a symbol for Östersund, along with the moose (see above).

Östersund was laid out with roads spanning from north to south countered by several alleys from east to west, which is why an alley in Östersund is synonymous with a road leading down towards Storsjön. From the inner city one may gaze upon Storsjön, Frösön and the Jamtish fell region with snow-clad mountains. This was made possible due to the topography and the grid plan.

The regularity in Östersund's road system and the slanting alleys leading from higher altitudes down towards Storsjön have created the "windows to the west" characteristic and unique to Östersund as a city. The alleys, often seen as rather steep, have created the illusion that the houses in the city core are climbing to higher grounds. These houses were conformed upon their construction to fit with the slopes.

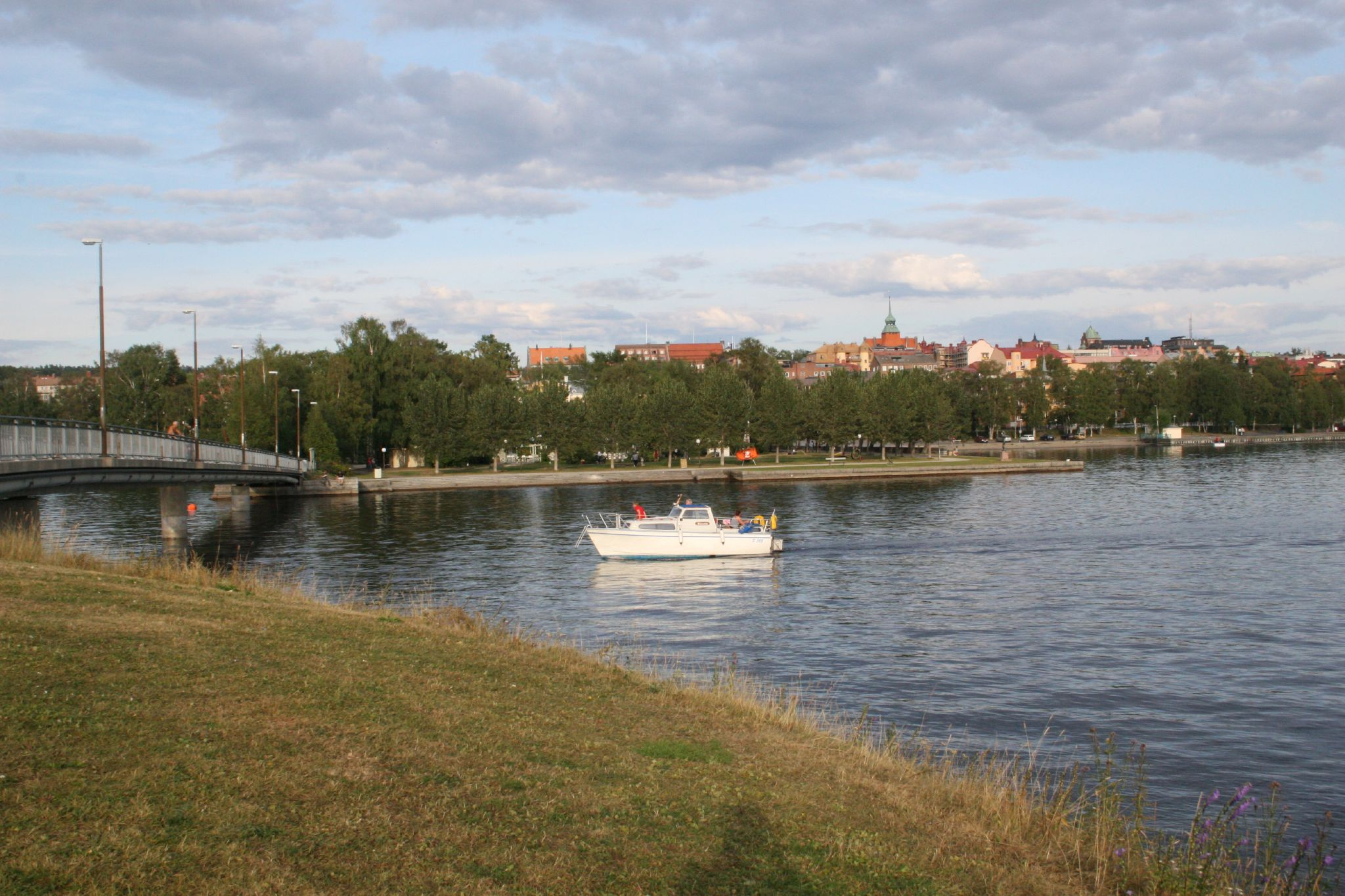
Badhusparken

The first city plan of Östersund was made with several large segments in the core being reserved as green areas. Östersund was thus planned as a green city and special lots, e.g. kryddgårdstomter 'spice garden lots' were created along with construction lots. These lots shifted with a construction lot alternating with a spice garden lot. The garden lots are no longer existent since they too have been constructed upon. Many of the fences that separated each lot from another with trees and verdure were left intact. The large green areas are still present, with parks such as Kyrkparken, Österängsparken and Badhusparken being the most prominent. Badhusparken was once the location of a large bath house (hence the name Badhus-) though it was torn down in 1881 when the railway was constructed. A new larger two-storey pompous bath house was later built on poles a few metres from the shore, enabling the population to bathe in the waters of Storsjön during summers. This house was also torn down when a new bath house with heated water was founded in 1938.

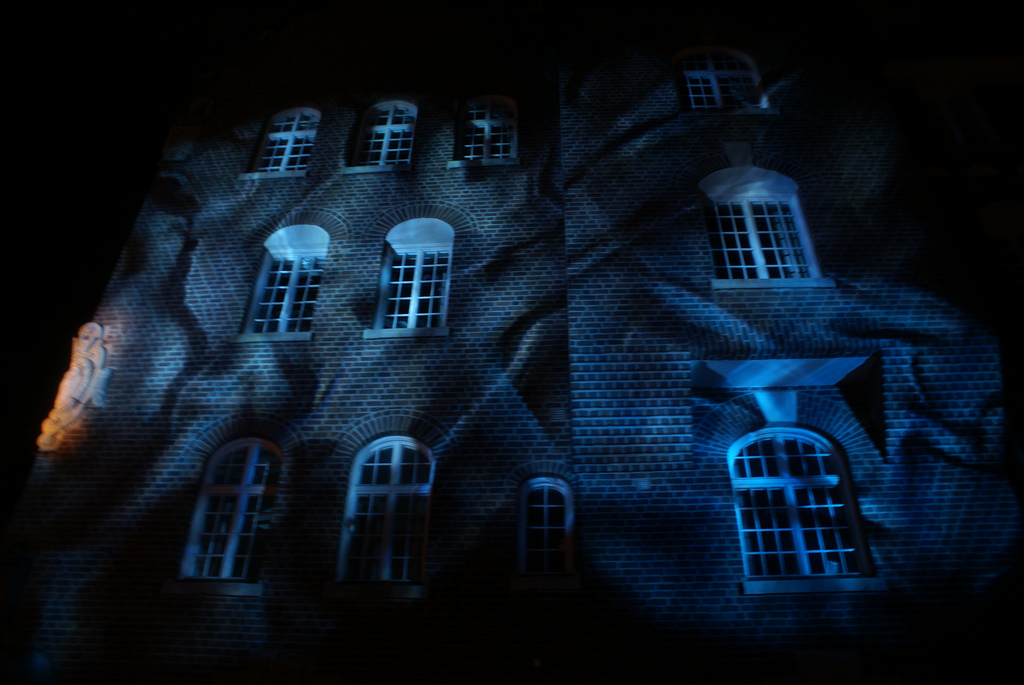
The national romantic Sparbanken building illuminated during the Winter Festival.

When Östersund started to grow as a city in the late 19th century the houses consisted predominantly of wood, though stone had become popular in the central parts. These houses were heavily characterized by Neo-Gothicism and Neo-Renaissance architecture. A very common feature of these houses were towers, some even resembling those on old castles like the one on Hotell Grand at the main square. In the early 20th century a new age had come and in the main road, Prästgatan, the new age came fiercely. The wooden houses were replaced by stone buildings, because a city's well-being was measured in how many stone buildings it had. At the same time military barracks were constructed in connection to the older settlement. Jugendstil became popular too as an addition to the National Romantic style architecture.

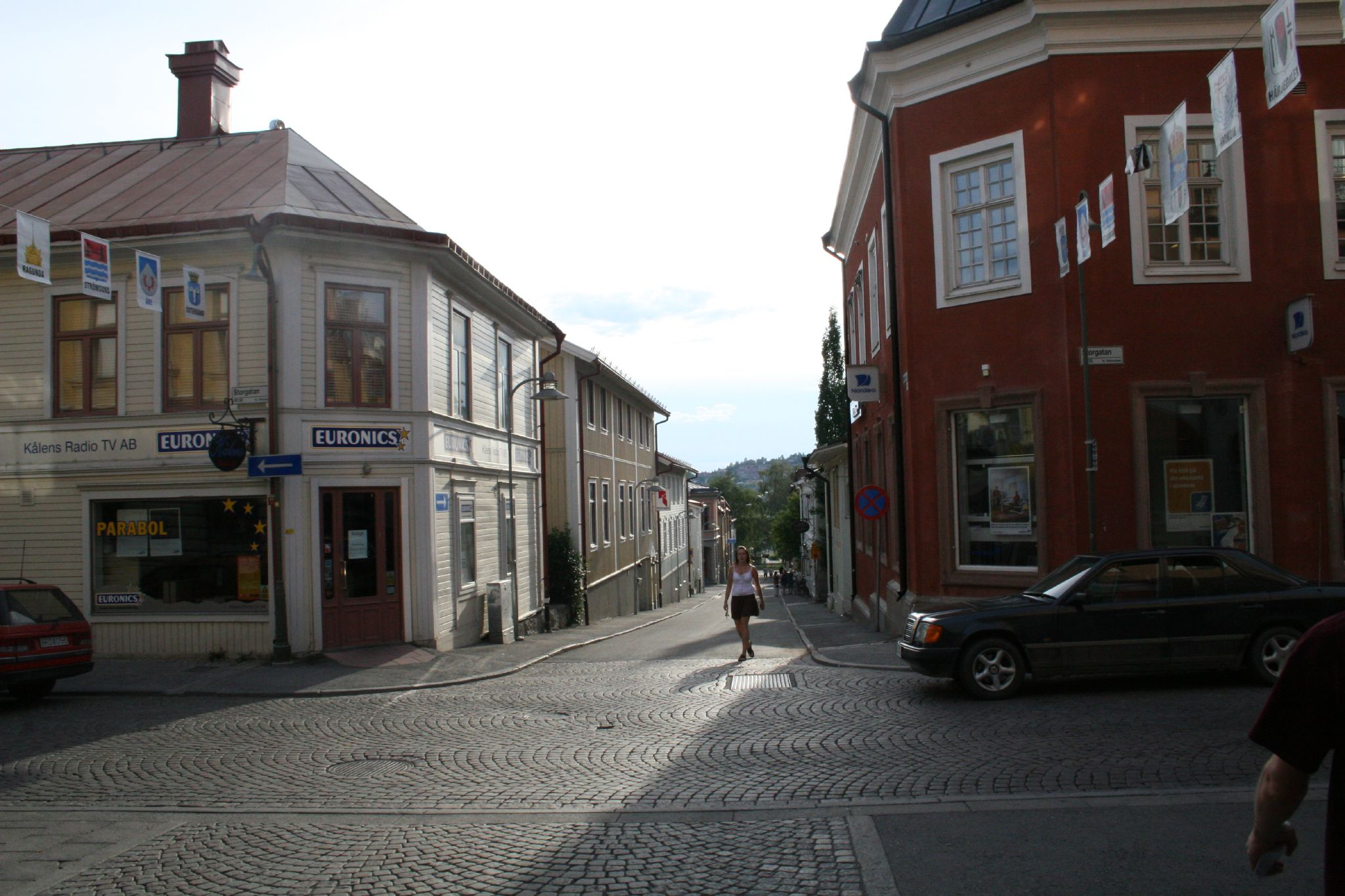
Storgatan in Östersund with an alley, a window to the west, down towards the Storsjön lake.

In the 1930s, the functionalistic style made itself apparent in Östersund's outskirts, which were growing. In the 1940s, the city was made more car-friendly and the city was first and foremost planned for cars. Later sanitation issues were brought up, which resulted in the construction of a sewage treatment works and waste water was no longer flushed directly into Storsjön. Östersund was also affected by the Million Programme, though to a lesser extent than other cities. During the same period older buildings such as Hotell Grand (to make room for Storsjöteatern), Cellfängelset (a jail located at the beginning of Prästgatan), Flickskolan (the girl school next to the city hall, where the current county library is located) and Västra stationen (at Badhusparken) were torn down. The local media described it as "demolishing madness". When the Good Templar house was threatened in order to widen Rådhusgatan the city's inhabitants had had enough and the building was saved.

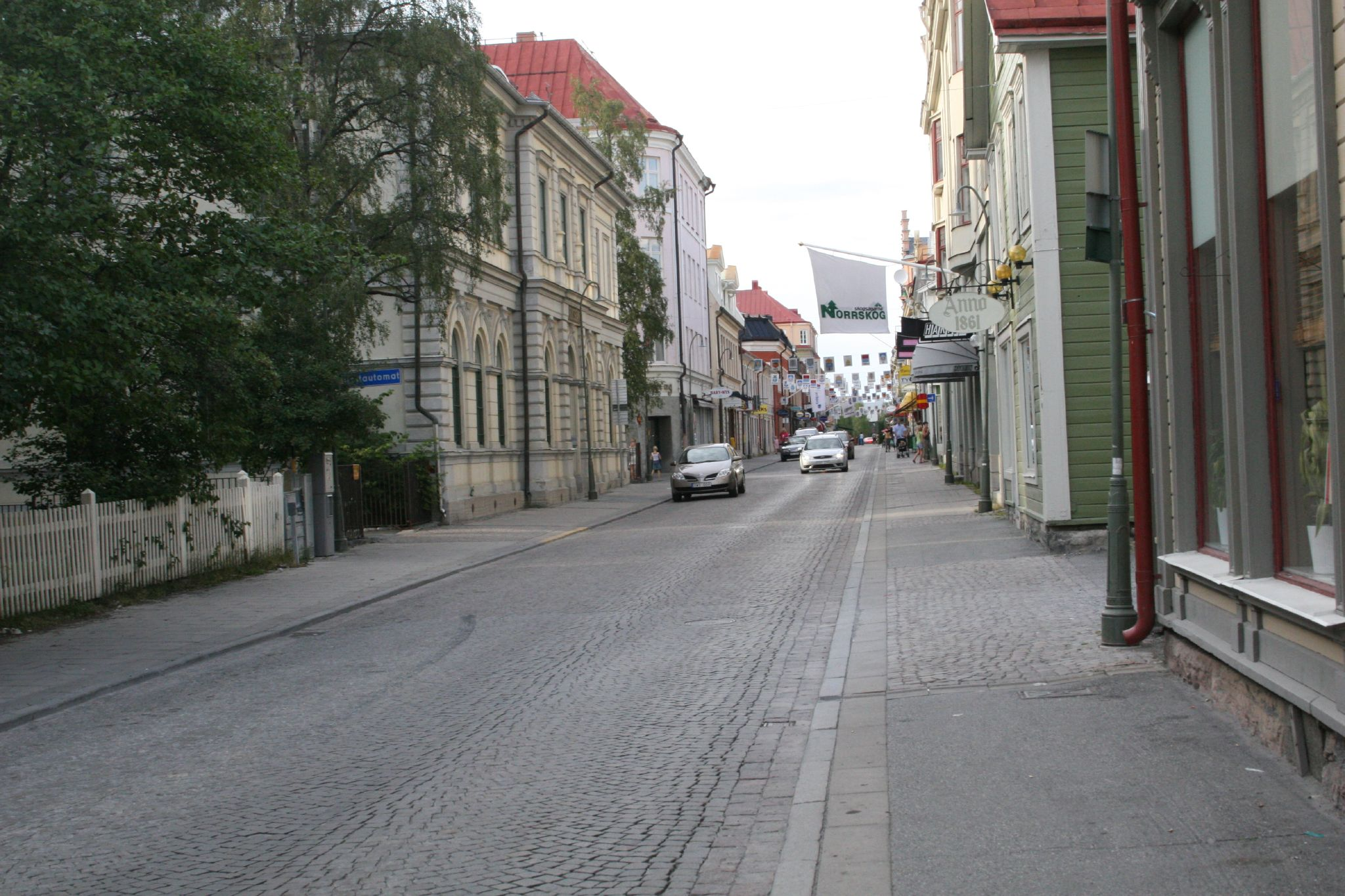
Storgatan with a "spice garden lot" to the left.

The buildings along Storgatan (literally: 'the large street') with entire segments intact since the 1880s are considered one of the best preserved city settlements in Sweden. The wooden façades are rich with details and the house are relatively low, short and slim. A great amount of work was put down on creating a balance between details and entirety. Parallel with Storgatan lies Prästgatan – 'the priest street', Östersund's main shopping street. The buildings between the two streets are often connected and the streets create small rooms mostly inaccessible for keen winds. These so-called rooms also stimulate the social life on the streets.

Stortorget – the main town square in central Östersund is one of six "closed squares" built in Sweden, the others being the ones in Uppsala, Karlstad, Vimmerby, Piteå and Haparanda. It was created through indentation in four different blocks to deliberately create an open air room with openings to every direction, a style deriving from how cities were planned during the Renaissance. However the town square lost its original shape when it was opened up and expanded towards the lake. Stortorget has long been the city's main market place and core; it is also here that the thousand-year-old market Gregorie market is held each year in March. The city festival Storsjöyran has Stortorget as its main centre.

=== Districts and housing estates ===
Before Östersund was established the population in the area was very scarce. In Odensala and Torvalla older settlements existed; the name Odensala can be derived from the Viking age and the Halls of Odin (though Torvalla means 'dry wealds' with no reference to Thor). These two villages were later incorporated into Östersund and are today two major urban districts. Besides them the urban districts of Staden, Norr, Söder, Odenslund, Karlslund, Körfältet, Odenskog, Lugnvik are found on the mainland of Östersund. On the island Frösön are the six urban districts Hornsberg, Östberget, Frösödal, Mjälle, Valla and Härke.

The central parts of Östersund are a part of the urban district Staden – 'the city', which has become synonymous with Östersund for many people living in the nearby villages and towns. As Östersund is the only city in the area and nearest city for many it is common to call it Stan, though the dative form Staa has increasingly grown unusual. The residents of Östersund are referred to as östersundare, though local people in rural areas call them stassbon 'towners', and stassbo 'towner', in singular.

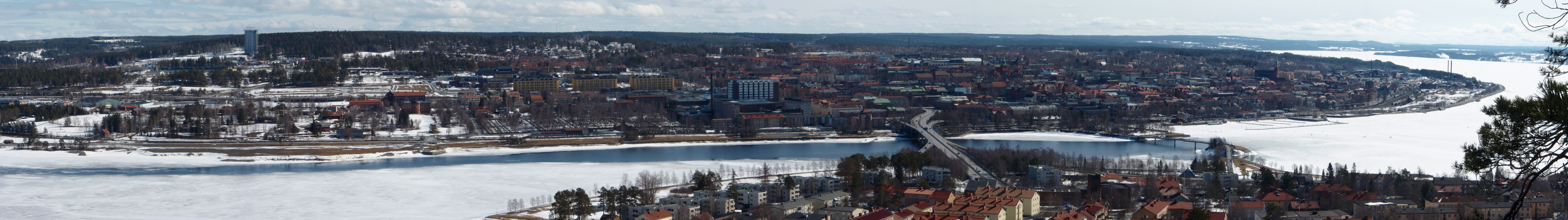
View of district Norr and Staden during early spring, as seen from the hill Östberget in district Hornsberg on the island of Frösön.

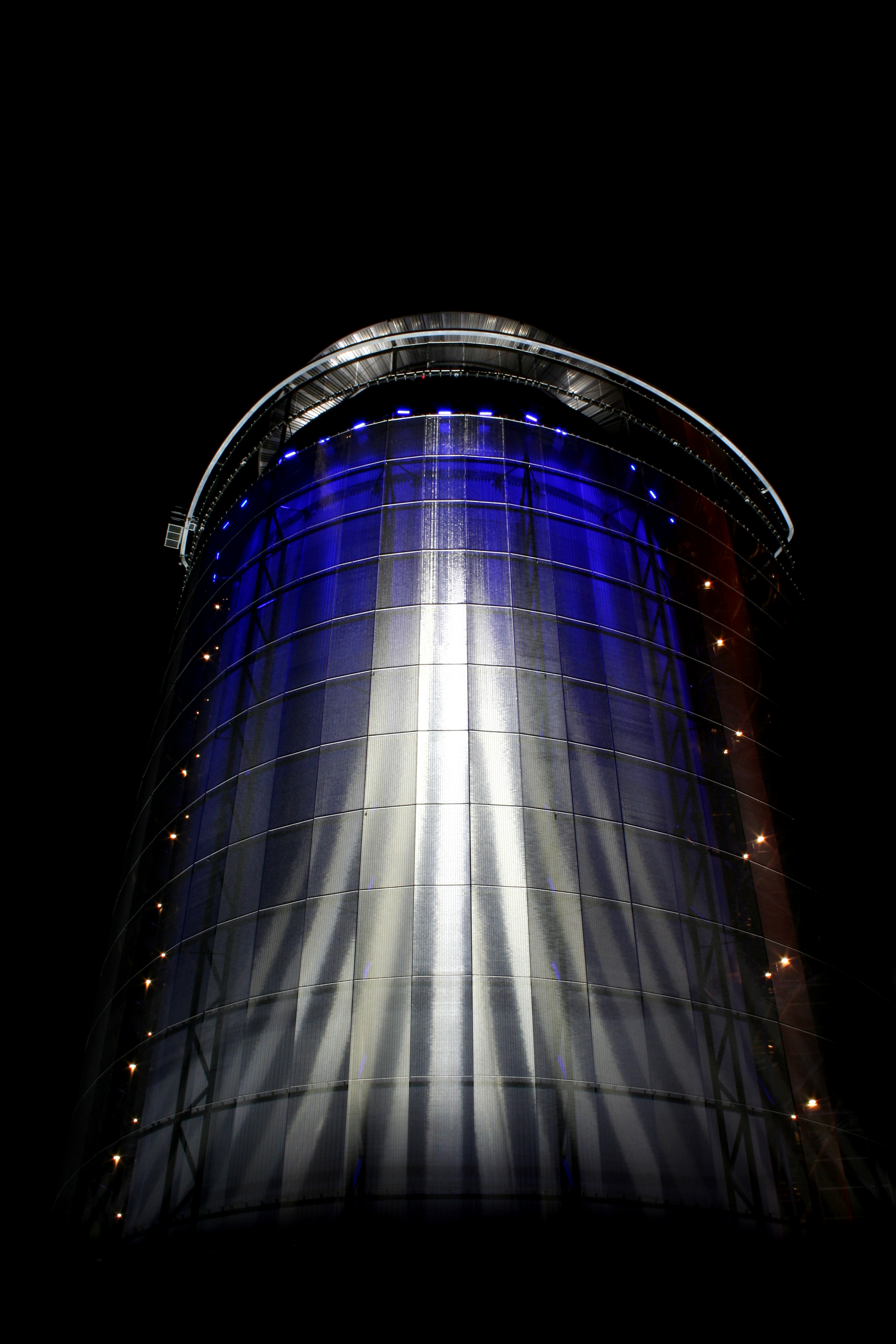
Arctura

=== Landmarks ===
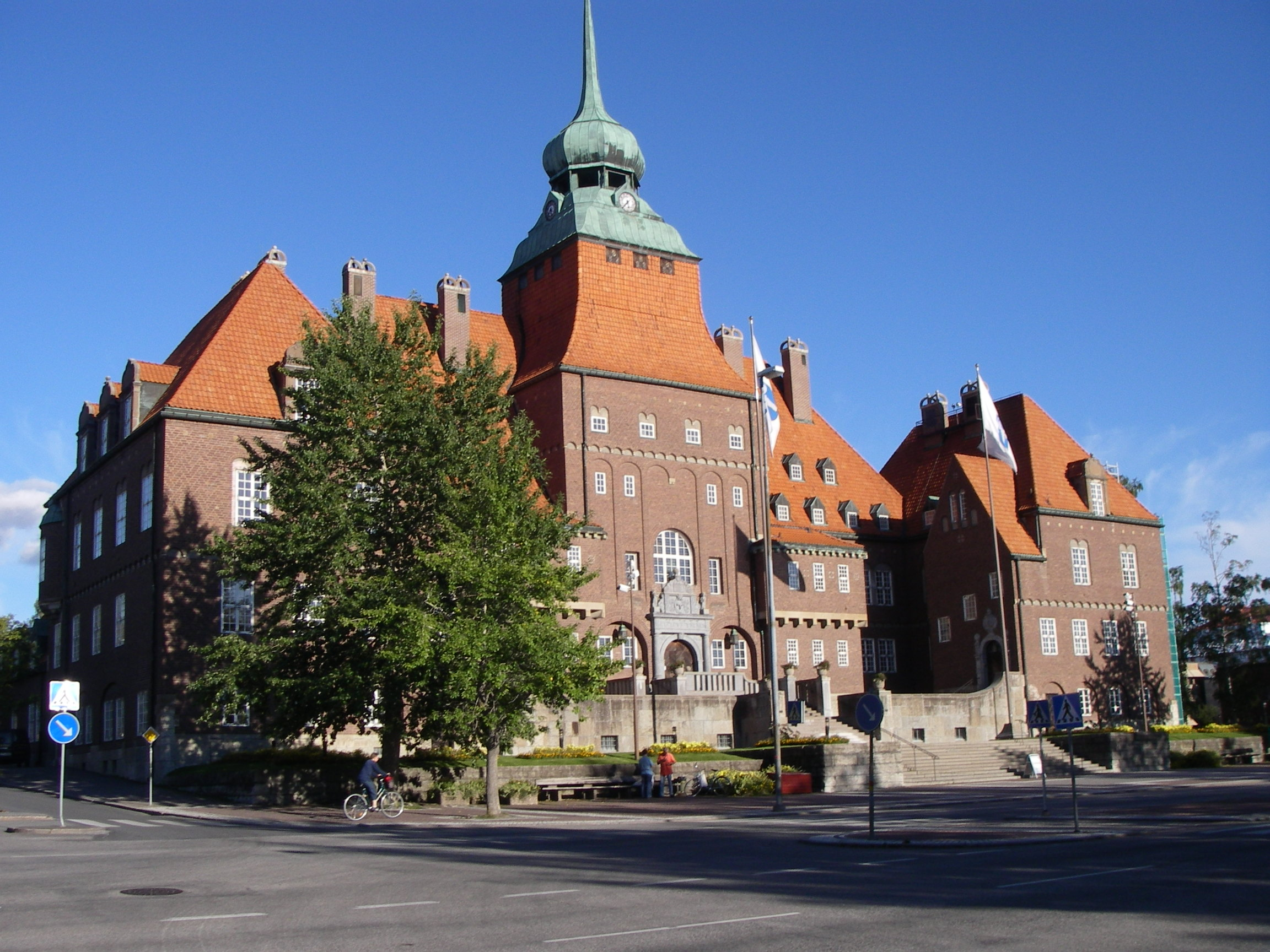
Östersund City Hall

The most well-known landmark of Östersund is the national romantic Östersund City Hall (Östersunds rådhus). It is 51 meters tall, contains 136 rooms and opened in 1912. It is the greatest constructional symbol of the National Romantic architecture in Östersund. The city hall looks almost like a fortress and has a particular connection to the local art of Jämtland. The bell tower is of typical Jamtish design, shaped like an onion. Local sculptor Olof Ahlberg (1876–1956) made most of the sculptural details and the ornaments are made from Jamtish limestone.

Östersund City Hall was designed by Frans Bertil Wallberg (1862–1935) and was seen by contemporary colleagues as the best of modern Swedish architecture. The main part of the building is accentuated by a grand tower and a monumental stairway. It is accompanied by only one wing, the north wing, as the second, south wing, was torn down in the 1970s.

A recently built landmark is Arctura, named after Jämtland's provincial star Arcturus, a large hot water accumulator tank. Due to its appearance it is referred to as Termosen ('the Thermos'). At night the 65-meter building is illuminated with various lights to give the appearance of sunrise and the Aurora Borealis, for example.

== History ==
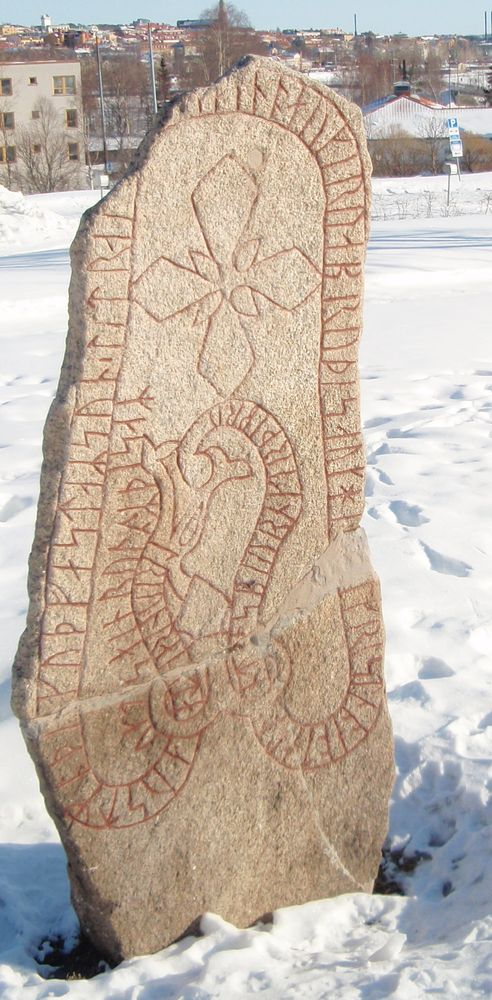
The Frösö Runestone is situated on Frösön in Östersund.

Lake Storsjön's shores have long been inhabited. The area where Östersund is situated was for a very long time Frösön's link to the east mainland. Frösön, the island of the Norse god Freyr, was originally the centre of the region and it was here the only inland Scandinavian hill fort, Mjälleborgen, was built around 300 AD. The ancient Scandinavian thing Jamtamót was held on this island, the christening of Jämtland begun here and it was here the world's northernmost raised runestone, Frösö Runestone, was raised.

Plans regarding the foundation of a Swedish city or köping (market town, 'Chipping') in Jämtland existed among governmental officials already after the previously Norwegian province was ceded from Denmark-Norway in 1645. Queen Christina demanded the establishment of a sconce on Andersön shortly after the province became Swedish; this sconce would together with Frösö sconce secure Swedish control of Jämtland. Christina's intention was to locate the "Jamts' city" within this fortification. In order to construct the sconce the local inhabitants were coerced into forced labour 1651 but after protests and lack of capital the project was ended in 1654.

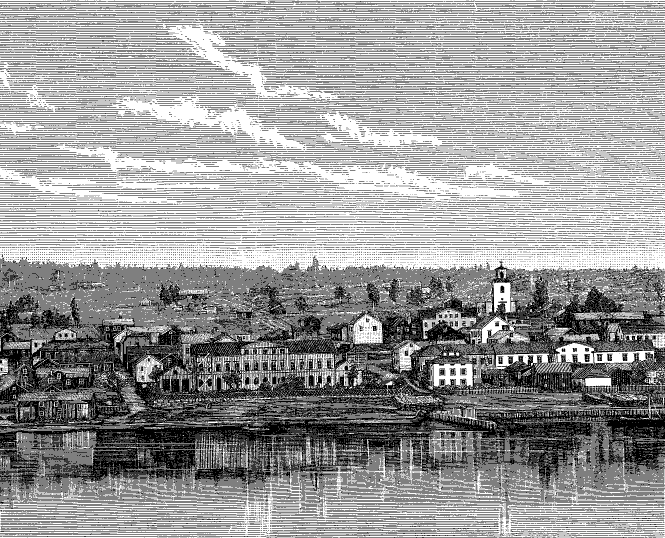
Östersund in the mid-19th century, the church in the picture was the first church in Östersund. When the houses were smaller it dominated the cityscape.

In 1758, the plans were brought back up through an initiative from the chief financial director Pehr Schissler and the proposition did however initiate a new debate whether or not a city was to be established in Jämtland, in order to counteract the trading and faring traditions of Jämtland's farmers. Several other attempts at concentration had previously been taken, and deemed unsatisfactory. Östersund was founded and given its charter by Monarch Gustav III of Sweden on 23 October 1786, shortly after the outskirt of the Odensala farmers' lands were bought for the purpose. Several other places had been suggested, like Huså, the then-largest settlement in Jämtland, along with Krokom, Sunne and Ede outside of Brunflo. Frösön was also a candidate but the lot fell on Östersund, as it was deemed most favourable. The only things actually located in the area at the time were the main road and the bridge to Frösön. Östersund was upon its foundation freed from taxes for a period of 20 years and completely liberated from trade regulations and guild order. In other remote locations of the Nordic region, similar cities were founded, like Reykjavík in Iceland the very same year, Tromsø (1794) in Northern Norway and Tampere (1775) and Kuopio (1782) in the Finnish inland. Östersund is however the only city in present-day Sweden to have been founded in the 18th century.

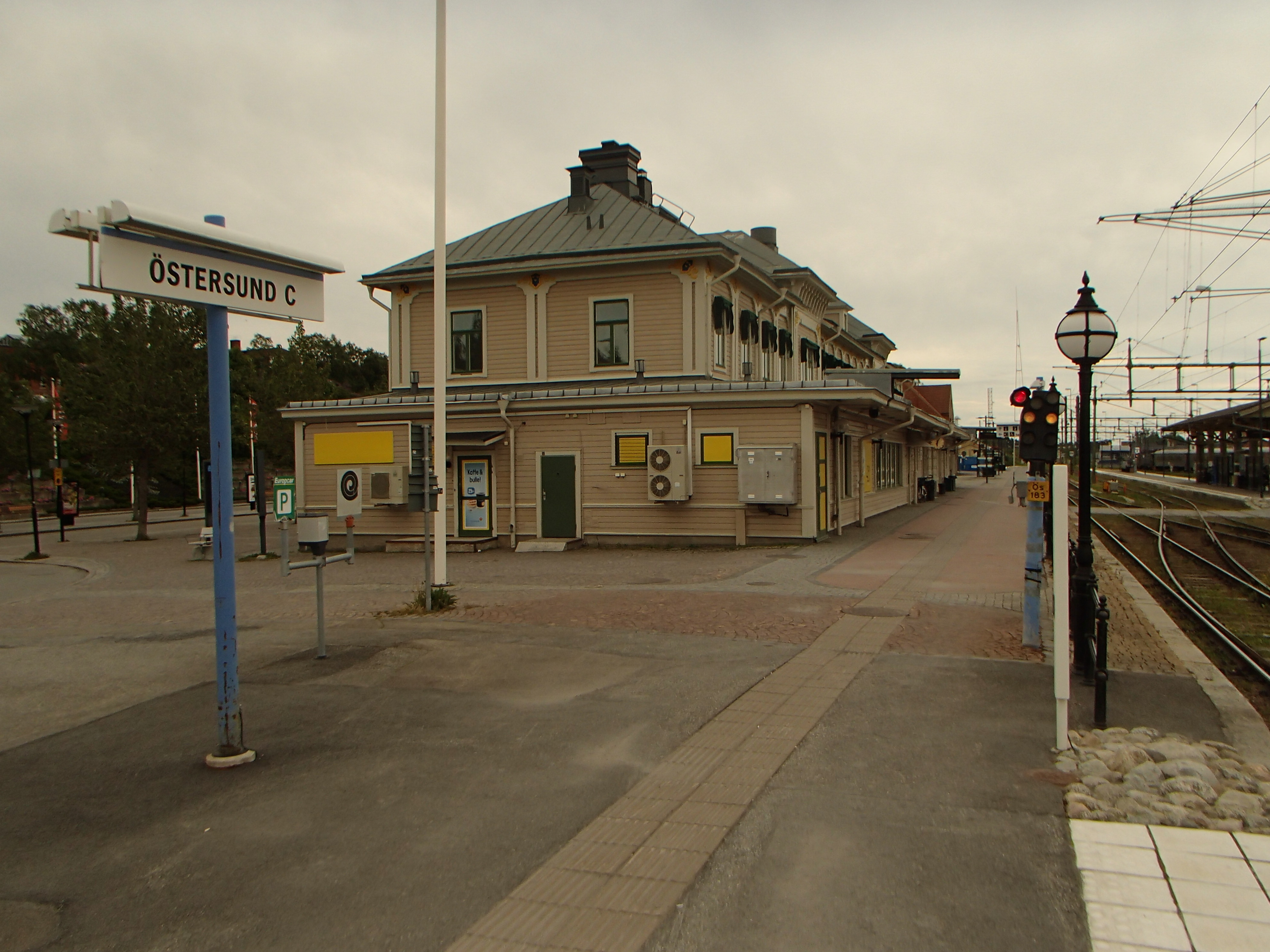
The main railway station was built in 1879

The city developed poorly and had to struggle in its infancy. The state tried to persuade the Jamtish traders on Frösön to migrate to the new city but they had no intentions of leaving such a rich parish with the fertile soils Frösön consisted of in favour of the swamp and marshes across the strait. During its first 50 years the city's population only grew by an average of eight people per year. The city became the county seat of the newly founded county consisting of the provinces Jämtland and Härjedalen in 1810, and a county council was established. Though, Östersund remained a de facto farming village with fewer than 400 inhabitants in 1820. An upswing occurred in the 1850s, as trade was liberalized and the logging industry developed.

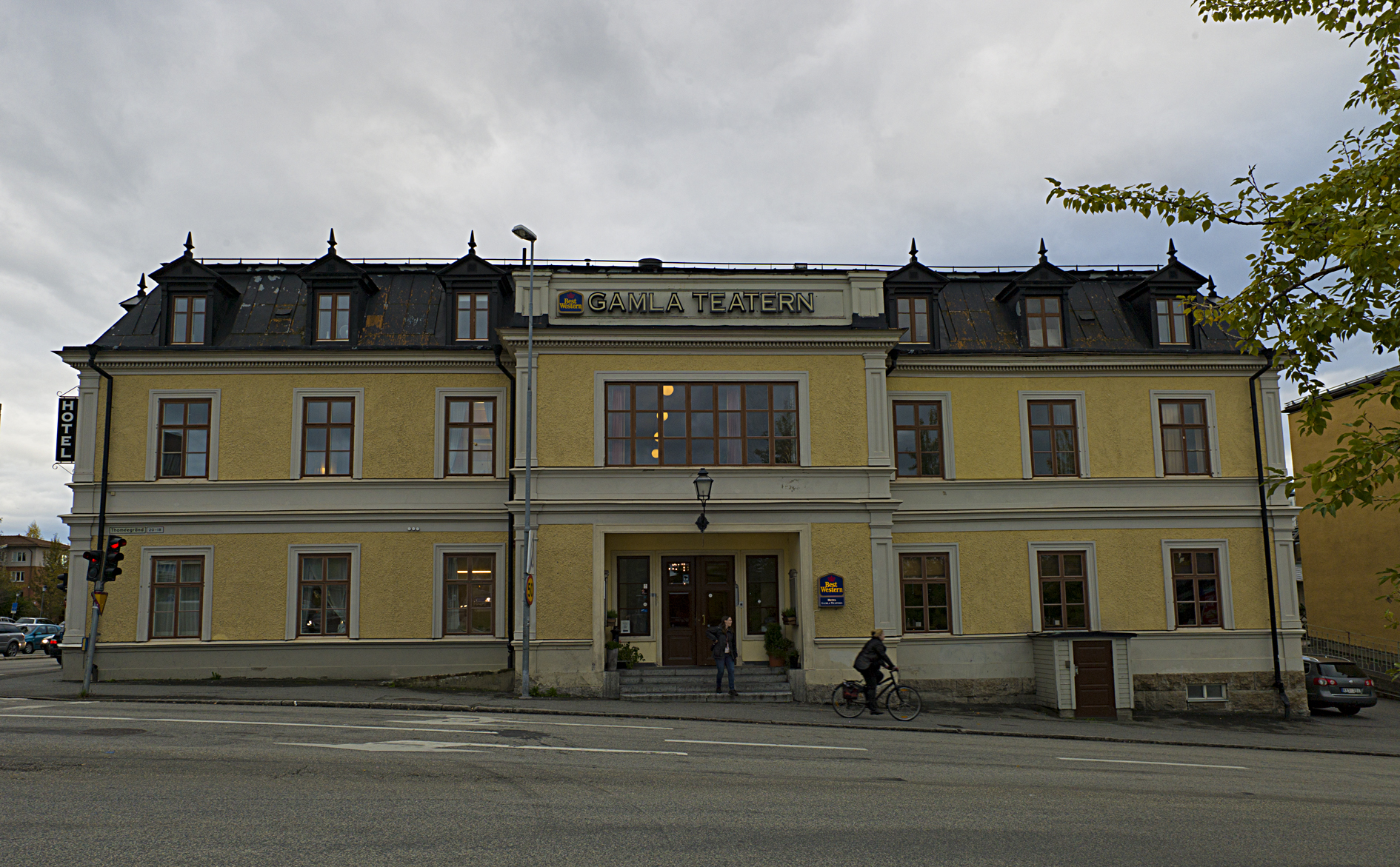
"The Old Theatre", originally built as an IOGT assembly house in 1884. Now a hotel and a restaurant.

It took until the construction of the railroad in 1879 before Östersund became a real city and actually gained the status as Jämtland's centre, at Frösön's expense. Thanks to the "farmer chieftain" Nils Larson i Tullus, the railroad came to pass through the city itself instead of outside it, as planned. The railway from coast to coast across the then-union between Sweden and Norway was finished in 1882, connecting Östersund more closely to Trondheim and Sundsvall. Östersund then came to grow faster than any other Swedish city. After ten years it had passed 20 Swedish cities in population. The city attracted immigrants, a slight majority from the Jamtish countryside, though still with a high number of settlers from southern Sweden. While Östersund was in its most intense state of growth, popular movements emerged among the inhabitants. In Jämtland and Härjedalen the Good Templar movement (a part of the temperance movement) came to dominate completely. In 1883, 700 of the city's total population of 3,000 were organized Good Templars. The greatest symbol of the movements grandeur was the Order House constructed in 1885 in the city, Östersunds-Goodtemplars-Ordenshus. When one of the most prominent leaders, Joseph Malins, visited the city he announced that it was the world's largest order house.

Many of the leading people behind the popular movements in Östersund saw industrialization as a significant threat to the native districts and the old village and farming community. The work from the movements made the city and its centre-right governance extremely hostile to industry. Instead they wanted to portray Östersund as a centre of outdoor activities, culture, education and tourism. Industry was not allowed to threaten the good environment and cultural history traditions.

In 1917 when the Great War was fought on the continent and with the February Revolution in Russia, the beginning of the Russian Revolution also affected Östersund. Rationing led to lack of supplies and a revolution was feared. Some of the citizens, primarily soldiers, went on hunger strikes and at the first of May that year 4,000 demonstrators gathered in front of the city hall demanding lower prices on milk and wood. The year after, the Spanish flu spread the world. The city doctor in Östersund noted that "Östersund ought without objection to have been more haunted by the flu than any other Swedish city", which is why Östersund was referred to by locals as spanska sjukans huvudstad, 'capital of the Spanish flu'.

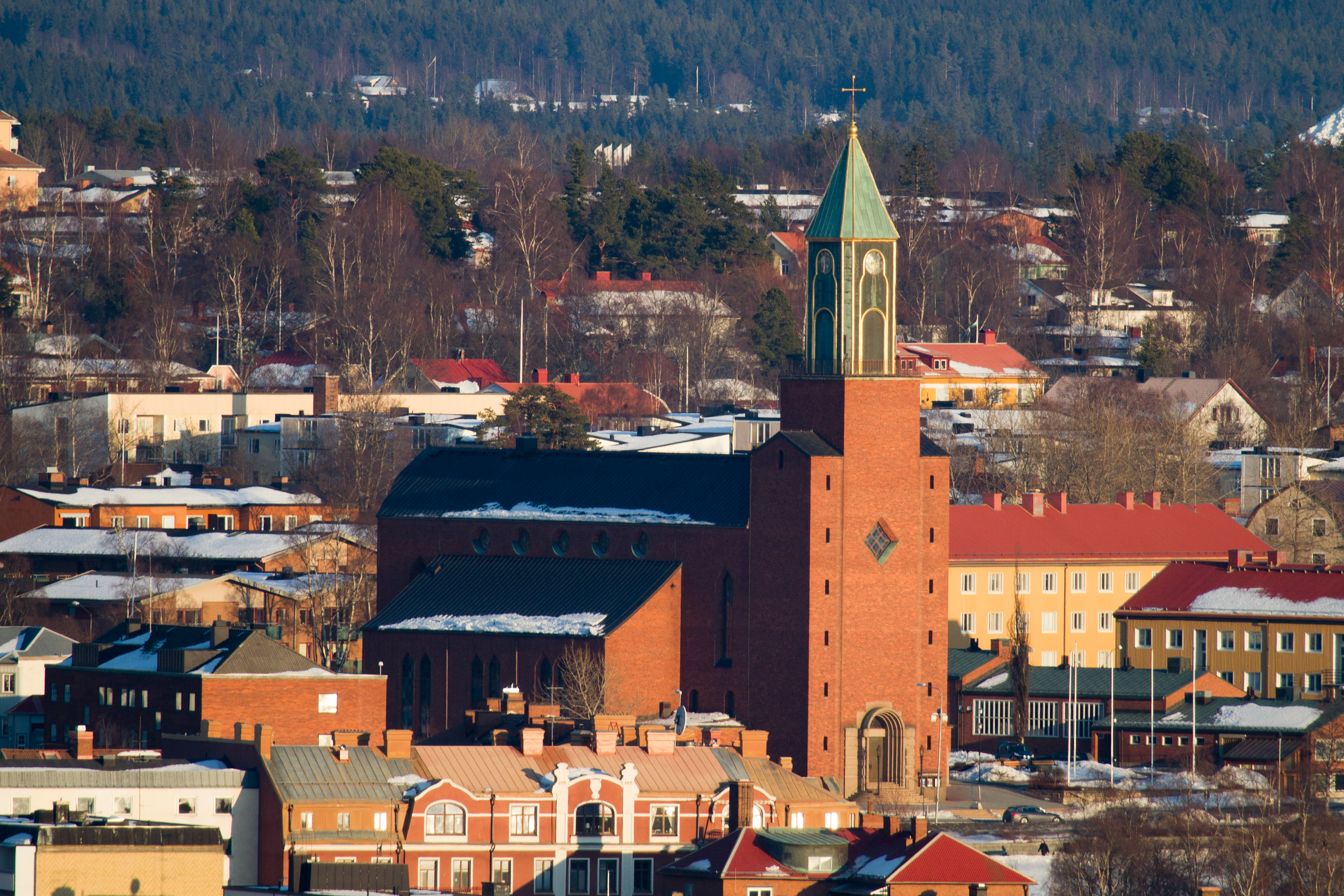
The large brick church was built in 1940.

Despite the Great Depression and several crises resulting in a very high unemployment rate, Östersund continued to grow in the interwar period. In 1918 the Odenslund area was incorporated. The business sector remained largely unaffected and Östersund continued to be one of the least industrialized cities in Sweden. Instead Östersund continued to focus on wholesale trade and became a centre for it in northern and north-central Sweden. The city's central position was strengthened when the Inlandsbanan railway was constructed through Jämtland from the north to the south. The first scheduled bus route was created in the 1920s between Östersund and the nearby town of Brunflo. In the next decade well over 40 bus routes were functioning in Östersund. The dairy was located west of the bus square, Gustav III:s torg, at the current site of the shopping mall Kärnan. This square naturally become a central part of the city.

Östersund continued to grow after the Second World War. Lugnvik was incorporated into the city in 1954 and Östersund was, like the rest of Jämtland, affected by the Rehn-Meidner-model, though not in the same way. The Swedish Keynesian policy was launched in order to improve the mobility of the labour force. Jämtland was struck hard by this when the people moved from the countryside to cities, from inland to coast and from the north to the south. As an urban area Östersund was affected by the Million Programme and urban districts like Körfältet were created.

Östersund became the capital of the Republic of Jamtland. Its flag can be seen throughout the year at the main town square.

The negative view towards industry changed when the Social Democrats came to power for the first time in the city's history in 1952. Industries were enticed to Östersund through the national localization policy and industrial areas were created in Odenskog and Lugnvik. Development was not, as already mentioned, as good in the rest of Jämtland as it was in Östersund and as a counter to the governmental policy, the Republic of Jamtland was established in 1963. Östersund became the capital of the tongue-in-cheek republic and the home of the freedom festival Storsjöyran.

Östersund continued to grow and in 1970 Frösö köping was made part of Östersund. In 1971 a major reform occurred in Sweden creating large municipalities replacing all the older institutions; the new large municipality was named after the city. As in the rest of Sweden, the public sector greatly expanded at this time. In 1960 the public sector of Sweden constituted about 30 per cent of Sweden's total gross domestic product; by the mid-1980s the number had grown to 65 per cent. At the time jobs were growing in the county council, the government and in the new municipality. The main reasons for the large expansion were the expanded transfer payment to the households that occurred along with growing interest and public consumption. Everything was financed by heavy tax increases. The entirety of the 1970s was a period of expansion. Besides the new industrial complex the Frösö bridge was constructed, a new police station, Z-kupolen (burned to the ground in 1989), Storsjöteatern, Folkets hus, neighborhood churches, malls, etc. The county administrative office and the hospital were expanded and large residential areas grew up in the aforementioned Körfältet and Lugnvik areas, as well as in Odensala.

As early as the 1940s, the city tried to have a humanities university college located on Frösön. Opposition between cities in Norrland was great and it was Umeå that finally emerged victorious in 1962. Östersund did, however, get a university college for social workers (socialhögskola) in 1971. Since 2005 Östersund has been one of the main campus sites of the Mid Sweden University (Mittuniversitetet). A number of governmental offices have also been built in the city in recent years.

== Garrison town ==
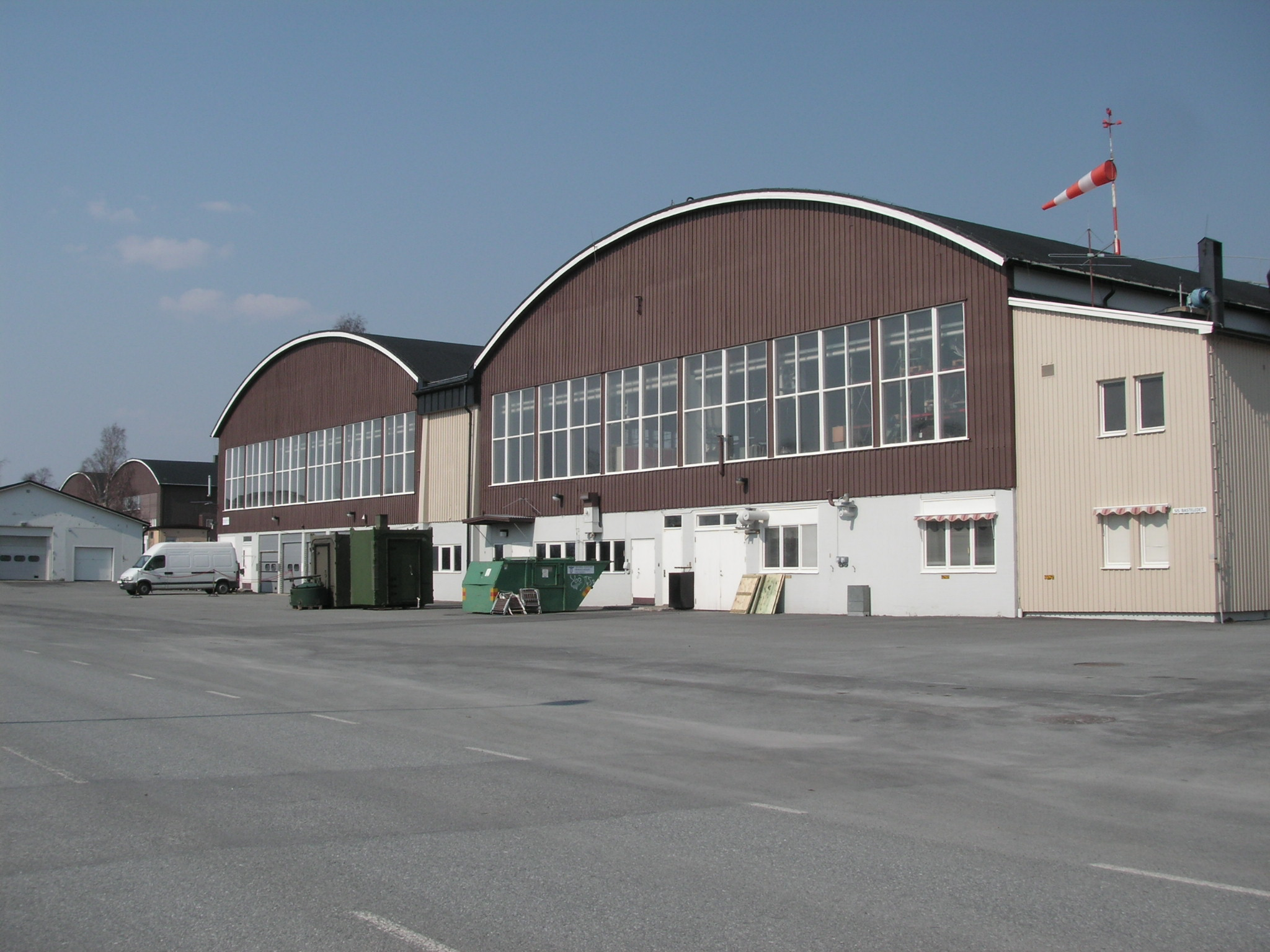
Hangar on Frösön

Östersund became a garrison town when the Norrland Artillery Regiment (A 4) was founded in the city in 1892, followed by the upgrading of the Jämtland Ranger Corps to the Jämtland Ranger Regiment (I 23). This was done with the growing fear of a Russian assault whereas Jämtland-Trøndelag and Norrbotten became the most prioritized defense regions. The dissolution of the union between Sweden and Norway contributed by enhancing Östersund as a military city and strengthening its presence; the Jämtland Ranger Regiment was located in the city in 1910 and the Jämtland Wing (F 4) came to Frösön in 1926.

Östersund's importance as a garrison town grew when the city was connected to the Boden Fortress, following the construction of the Inlandsbanan railway.

After the fall of the Iron Curtain, the destruction of the Berlin Wall in 1989 and the Dissolution of the USSR in 1991 Sweden had lost its national threat and the demand for a strong defense organization was deemed unnecessary. The issue was debated throughout the 1990s and the final decision came in 2004 where all military presence in Östersund was ended. Upon delivering the message the Swedish Minister for Defence Leni Björklund was publicly booed by the city's inhabitants.

The ending of Östersund's status as a garrison town has however created larger enthusiasm regarding the city's future as the private sector has grown larger and more companies are being established, much of which is due to the financial compensation offered by the state. The older areas reserved for military activities have been opened up and two more urban districts were made available.

== Politics and governance ==
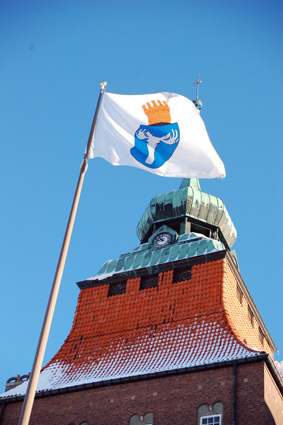
Östersund Municipality is governed from the city hall.

Östersund is the capital of Jämtland County and thus, the county governor Britt Bohlin Ohlsson resides in the city. Bohlin Ohlsson is the head of Jämtland County Administrative Board (Länsstyrelsen i Jämtlands län), an administrative entity appointed by the Swedish Government. Östersund is also the seat of Jämtland County Council (Jämtlands läns landsting). The County Council is the elected assembly of Jämtland County. The County Council's responsibilities lie primarily within the public health care system and transportation between the municipalities.

Östersund is the seat of Östersund Municipality (Östersunds kommun). The legislative body of the municipality is the 67-member municipal assembly (kommunfullmäktige), elected by proportional representation for a four-year term. The assembly appoints the municipality's main governing body, the 15-member executive committee (kommunstyrelsen). The executive committee is headed by the Mayor (kommunstyrelsens ordförande). Östersund has historically been dominated by the Conservatives, the freeminded (later on Liberal People's Party) and the Social Democrats. Though contrary to Sweden on a national level, Östersund's centre-right parties long remained in majority. The situation changed only in 1952 when the Social Democrats were included and they won an absolute majority in 1962. In 1966 the agrarian and rural Centre Party entered the scene, along with the minor Christian Democrat and Communist parties. A new centre-right municipal government was appointed and the Centre Party became the largest party in that coalition in 1970. However, since the 1980s the Social Democratic Party has been in power (excluding a term in the 1990s) supported by the communists (now Left Party) and occasionally the Green Party (entered in 1982). Jens Nilsson from the Social Democratic Party is the mayor of Östersund and has been so since 1997.

== Transport ==
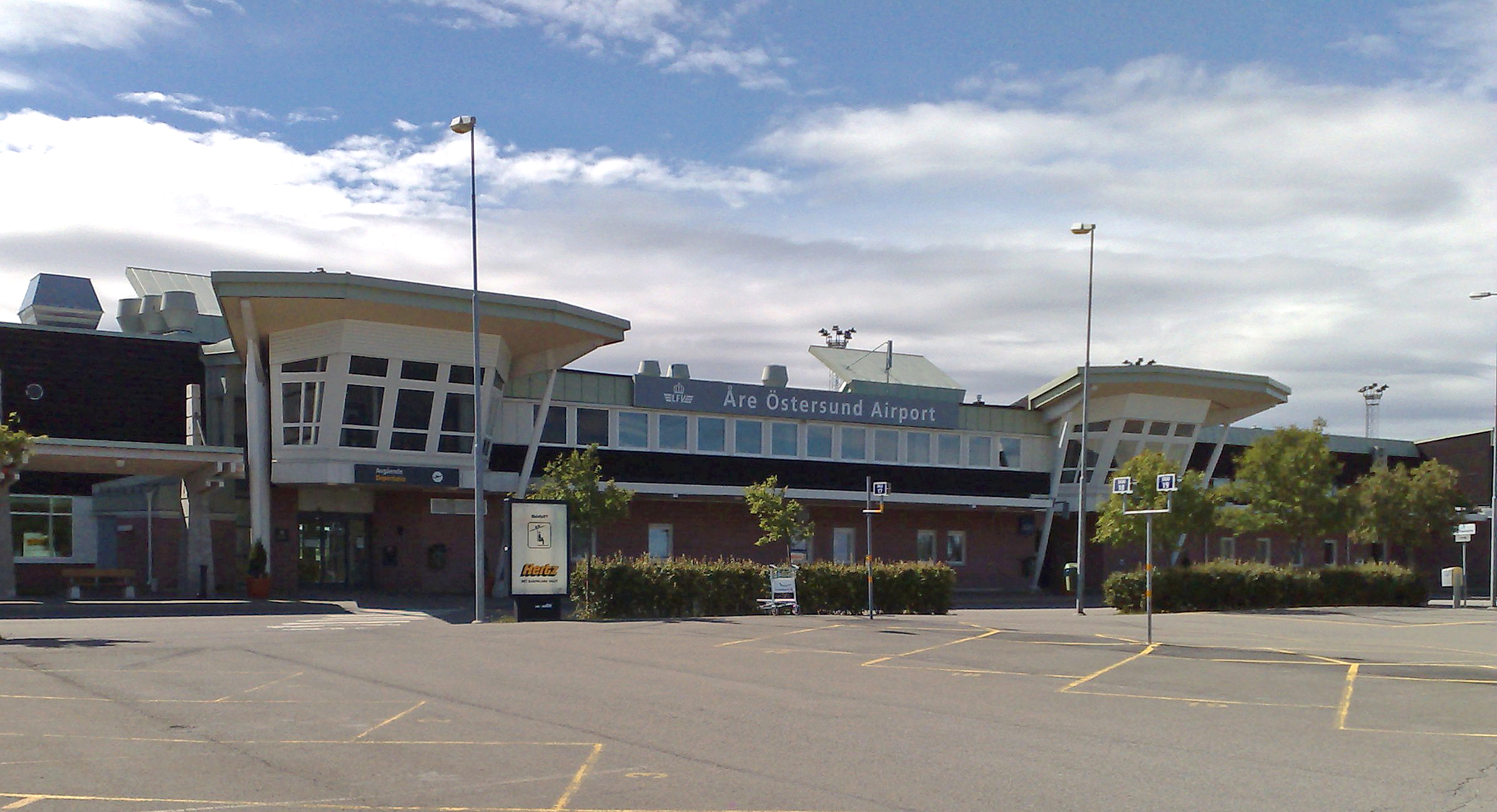
In 2006 Åre was included in the airport's name, in order to emphasize its role as a gateway to Sweden's largest ski resort.

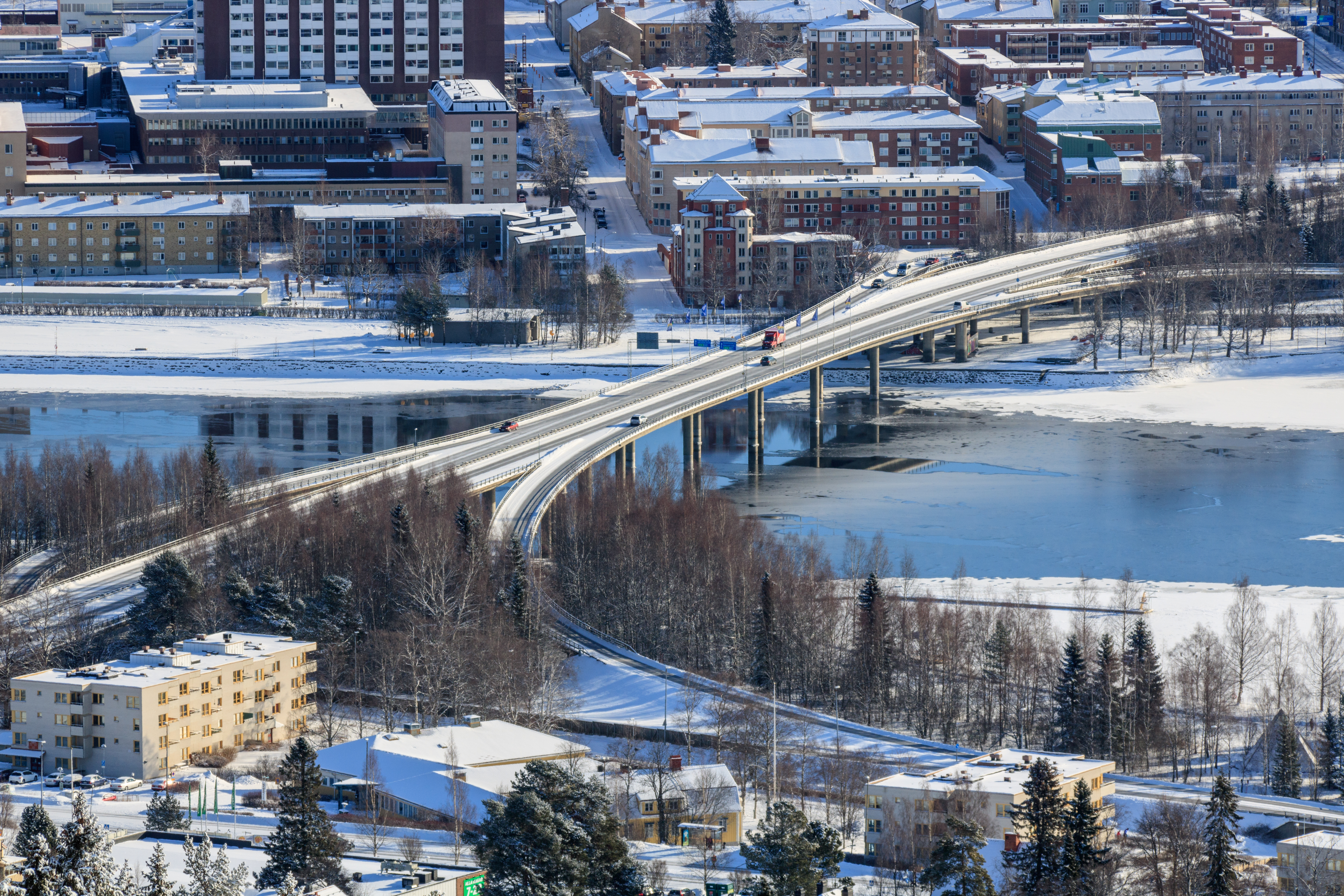
Frösö Bridge

The airport is situated 11 km (7 mi) outside the city centre, on the island of Frösön. Åre Östersund Airport (previously named Östersunds flygplats) is an international airport and the ninth biggest in Sweden with roughly 390,000 passengers in 2005. The airport is one of few Swedish airports with incoming foreign charter traffic and the only one with considerable economic growth in that sector.

The European route E14 runs through Östersund from Trondheim to Sundsvall and briefly merges with the European route E45 (referred to as Inlandsvägen locally) coming from the north. The two roads are later split in Brunflo where E14 continues heading east and E45 turns south again.

Östersund has passenger rail services to and from, mainly, Sundsvall and Stockholm. Norrtåg operates Mittbanan from Storlien to Sundsvall. Inlandsbanan runs in the same directions as European Route 45. Östersund is connected to Stockholm via long distance SJ 3000 (higher-speed trains), InterCity and night train. There are overnight services to and from Gothenburg and, seasonally, Malmö. Local company Stadsbussarna i Östersund (literally: 'the City Buses in Östersund') has nine routes in the city.

As Östersund is located on the shores of Storsjön, (English: 'the great lake'), it also has a harbour. There is also a harbour on the Frösö side of the strait. Several bridges span across Storsjön connecting Östersund with communities nearby, Frösöbron across Östersundet, Vallsundsbron from Frösön across Vallsundet to Annersia 'the other side' and Rödöbron from Frösön to Rödön in Krokom Municipality.

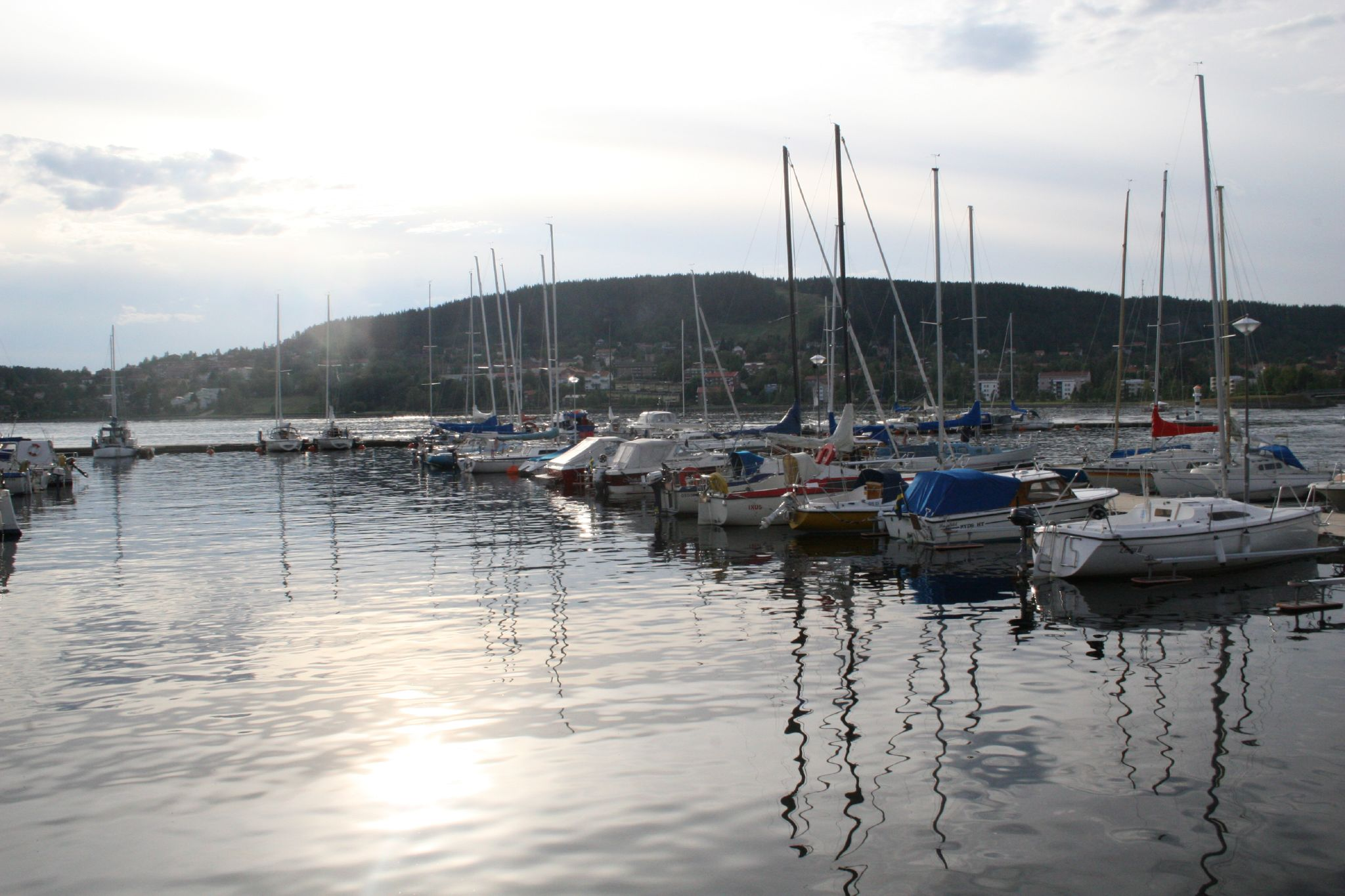
Östersund's harbour

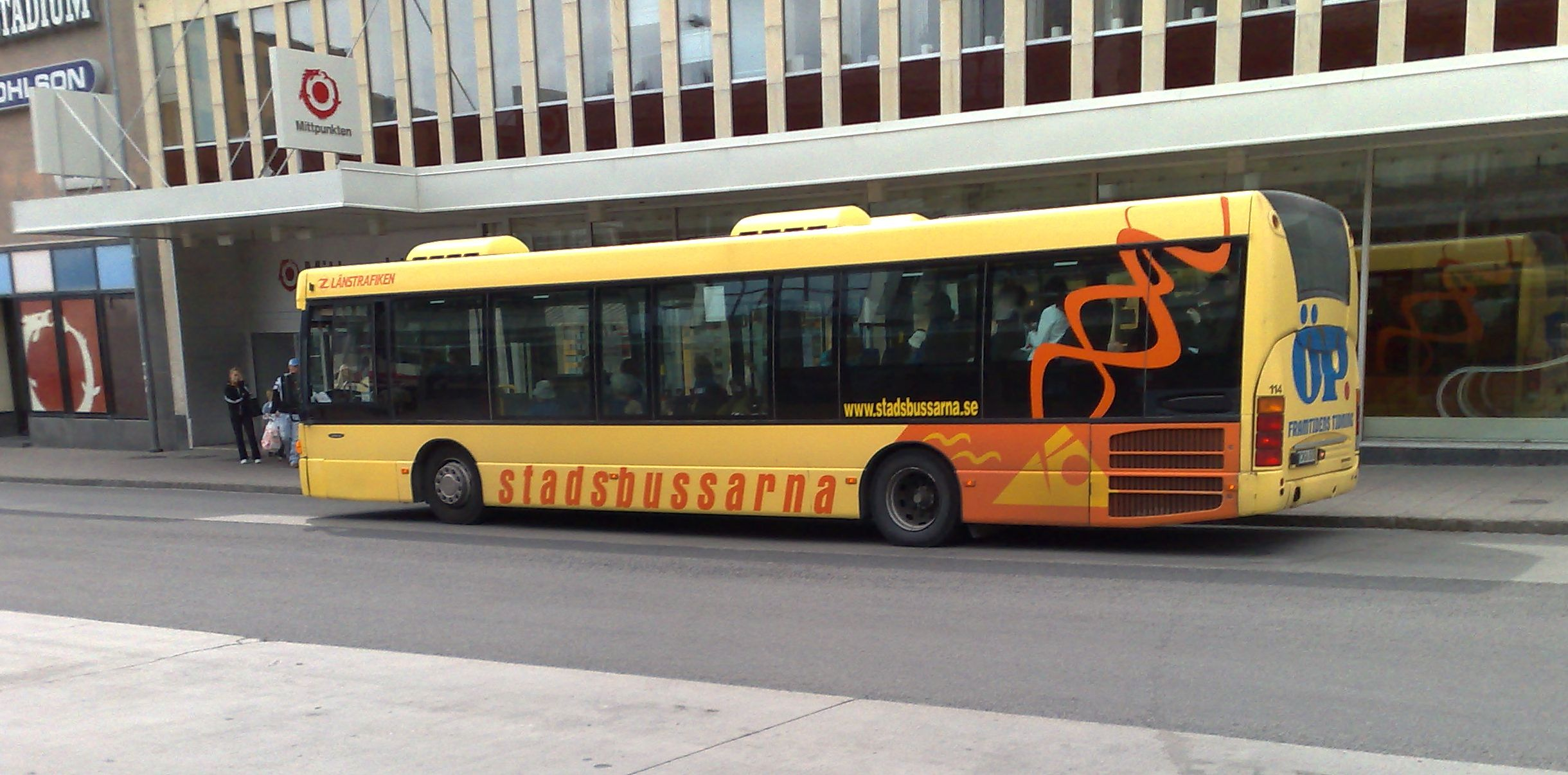
City bus

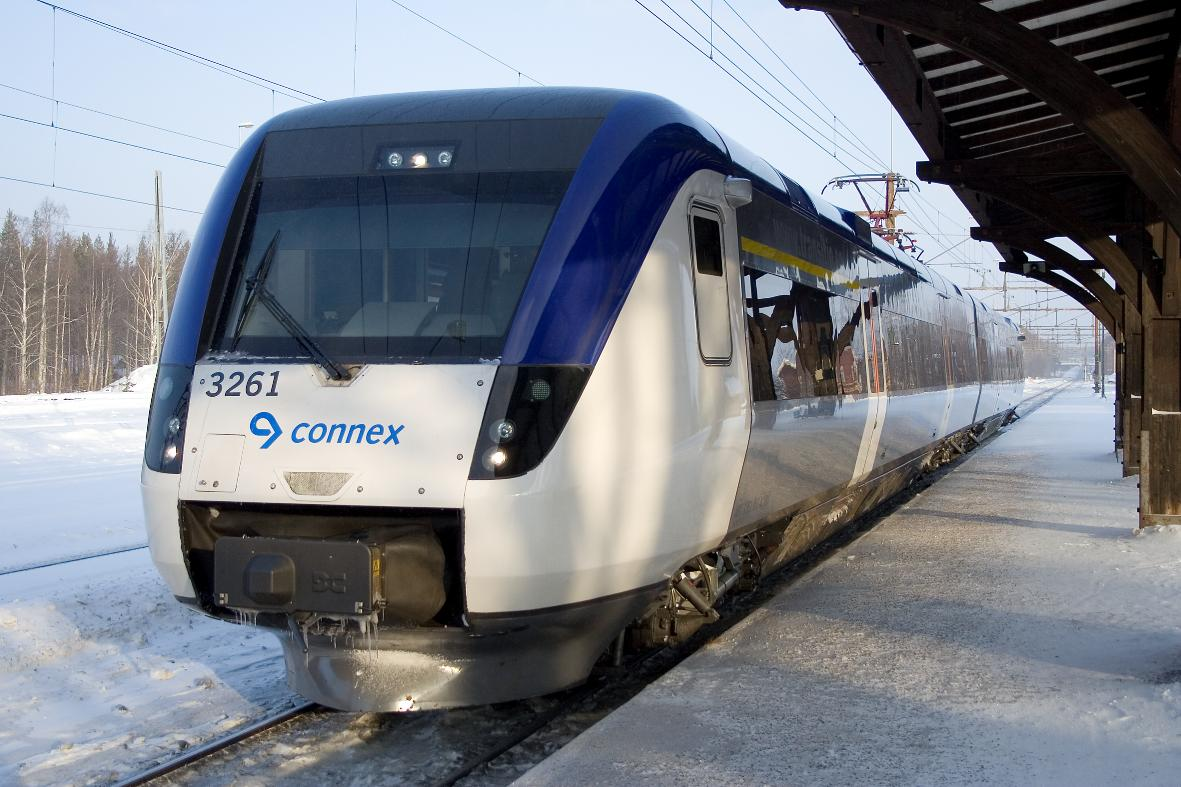
A train (before 2013) on the line between Östersund and Trondheim

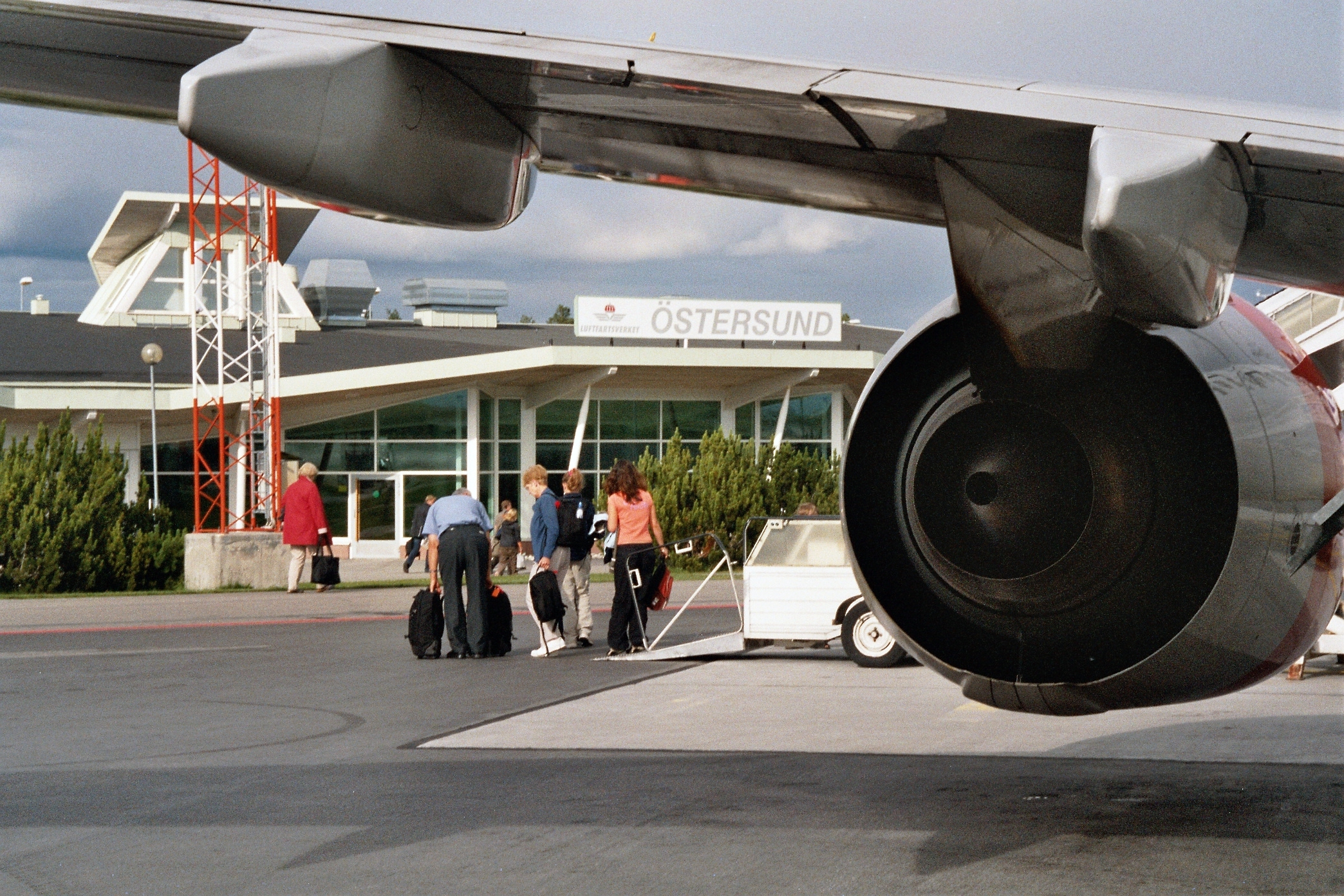
Airport terminal

== Trade and commerce ==
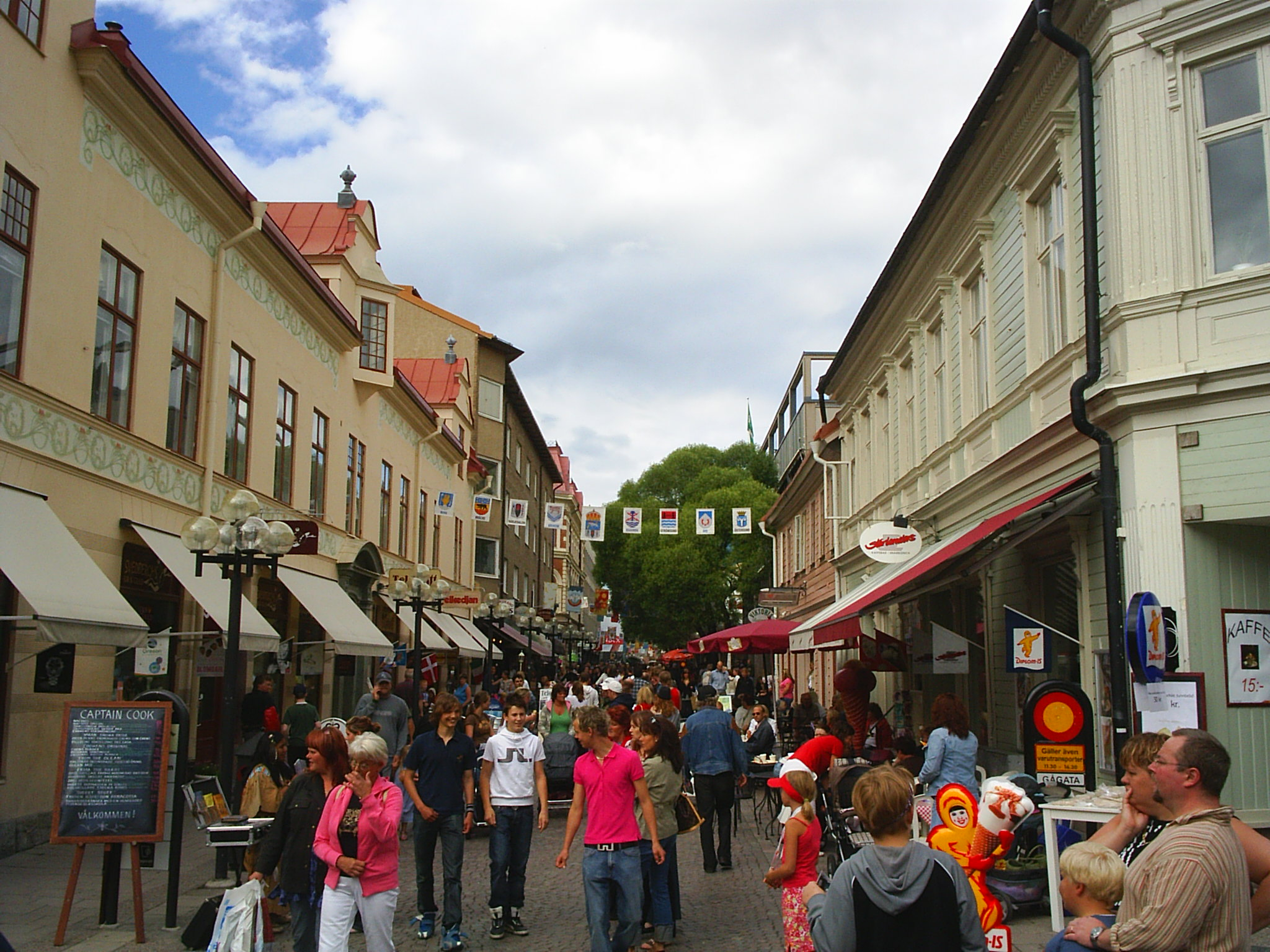
Prästgatan

Like the rest of Jämtland Östersund is heavily dominated by many small businesses. The city is the centre of trade and commerce in Jämtland County and has more than 300 shops. The retail trade's turnover is 30 per cent higher than it ought to be, given the number of inhabitants the city has. Trade in the central business district (Staden – 'the city') is mostly concentrated on the shopping and pedestrian street Prästgatan where large local shopping malls such as Kärnan and Mittpunkten along with department stores such as Åhléns are located. There are large clothing companies such as H&M and Lindex and smaller ones like WESC, approximately 50 restaurants, shoe stores, sporting goods retailers like Stadium and Intersport, several supermarkets (Östersund has rather few convenience stores), etc. Storgatan, the street that runs parallel with Prästgatan, is also lined with shops, restaurants and coffeehouses. Unlike Prästgatan this street is not a pedestrian street. Östersund is the city in Sweden with the most square metres of window display per capita. The most prominent figure in Östersund's business life throughout the 20th century was the car salesman (who started out selling horses) Sven O. Persson, founder of Persson Invest, Byggelit and Bilbolaget. A significant real estate owner was Maths O. Sundqvist (1950–2012).

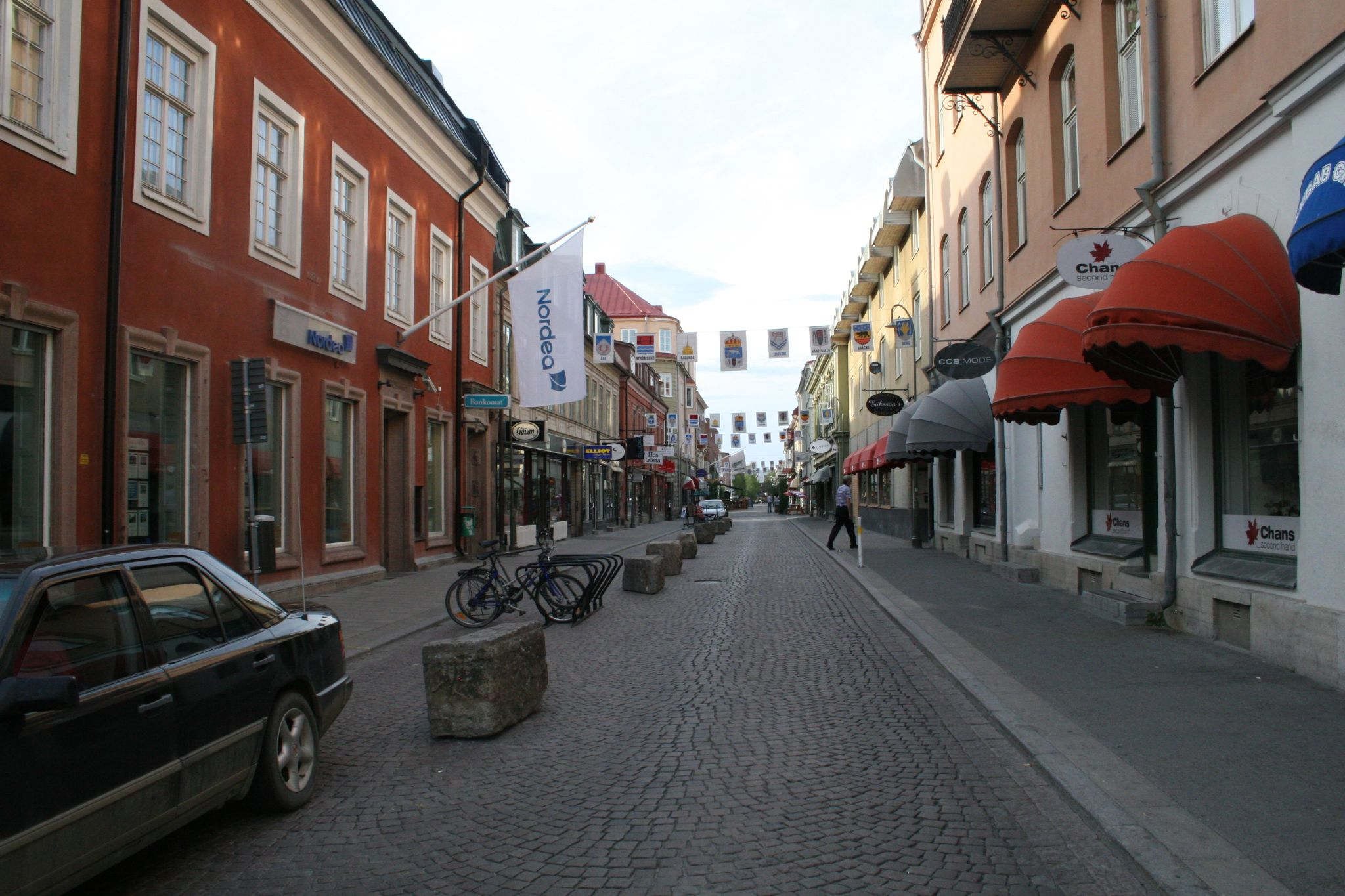
Storgatan in late afternoon.

Östersund has had a long history as a marketplace with the already mentioned ancient Gregorie market, tracing its lineage back to the 11th century, held in early March. Despite being banned in 1914, it continued to be held for a couple of years. In 1950, the market was reborn shortly and was completely resurrected in 1986, when the city celebrated its 200th anniversary, and has been held yearly since then. In 1948, when the markets were non-existent, visions to restore Östersund's market traditions in a modern version were brought up. The result was the trade fair Expo Norr, initiated in 1950 in order to strengthen Östersund as a leading centre of trade in the northern parts of Sweden. The trade fair is an annual event just like Gregorie market, though Expo Norr is held during the summer and not during the winter. Expo Norr is usually attended by 30,000 individuals every year.

Like many other county capitals in Sweden the county council and the municipality are among the largest employers.

Besides trading and public services Östersund has some larger companies such as Solectron, Cybercom, Volex, Husqvarna AB, Swedbank's telephone bank and Telia. Companies such as the dairy cooperation Milko and Inlandsbanan AB have located their corporate headquarters in the city.

A national survey done by the Confederation of Swedish Enterprise shows that out of every company in Östersund Municipality 52 per cent are "very positive towards globalization", thus ranking Östersund at number eight in Sweden as the most globalization-friendly municipality (2008).

== Culture ==
=== Cultural venues ===
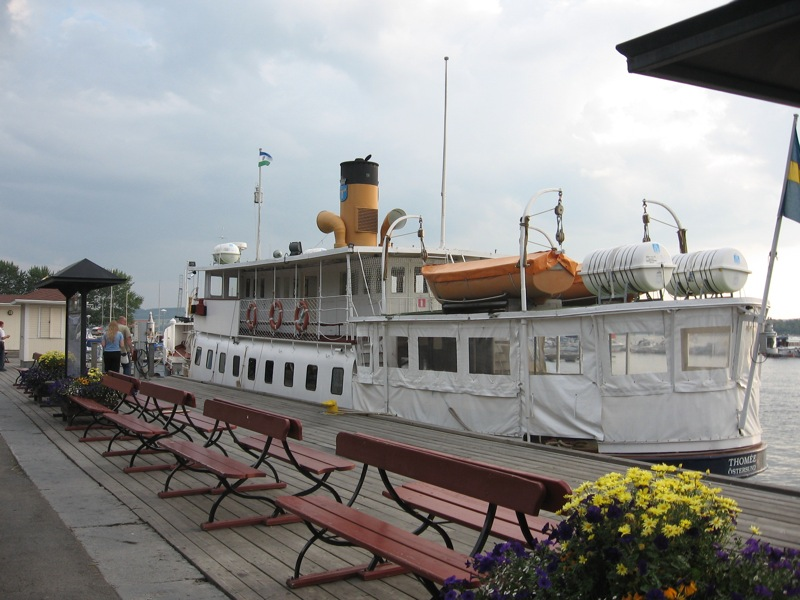
S/S Thomée moored in the harbour.

Östersund is the cultural centre of Jämtland County and home to the prize winning museum Jamtli. The museum has both an indoor exhibition area and an outdoor area which contains a number of historical buildings from all over the county, depicting the old lives of peasants, the early city of Östersund and the Scandinavian inland herding. The museum exhibition hosts an interesting set of tapestries, the Överhogdal tapestries, showing a rich imagery of both Norse and Christian origin from the Viking Age. The mythical Storsjöodjuret (Great Lake Monster) has an exhibit of its own. Another remnant from the Viking Age is Frösöstenen, one of the world's most northerly rune stones located on Frösön, the island of Freyr.

The county library, Jämtlands läns bibliotek, is located in the city. It is the oldest county library in Sweden, being founded in 1816 by the will of professor Carl Zetterström. As the library grew it was moved to a bigger facility. The older building is now situated beside the old church in Kyrkparken.

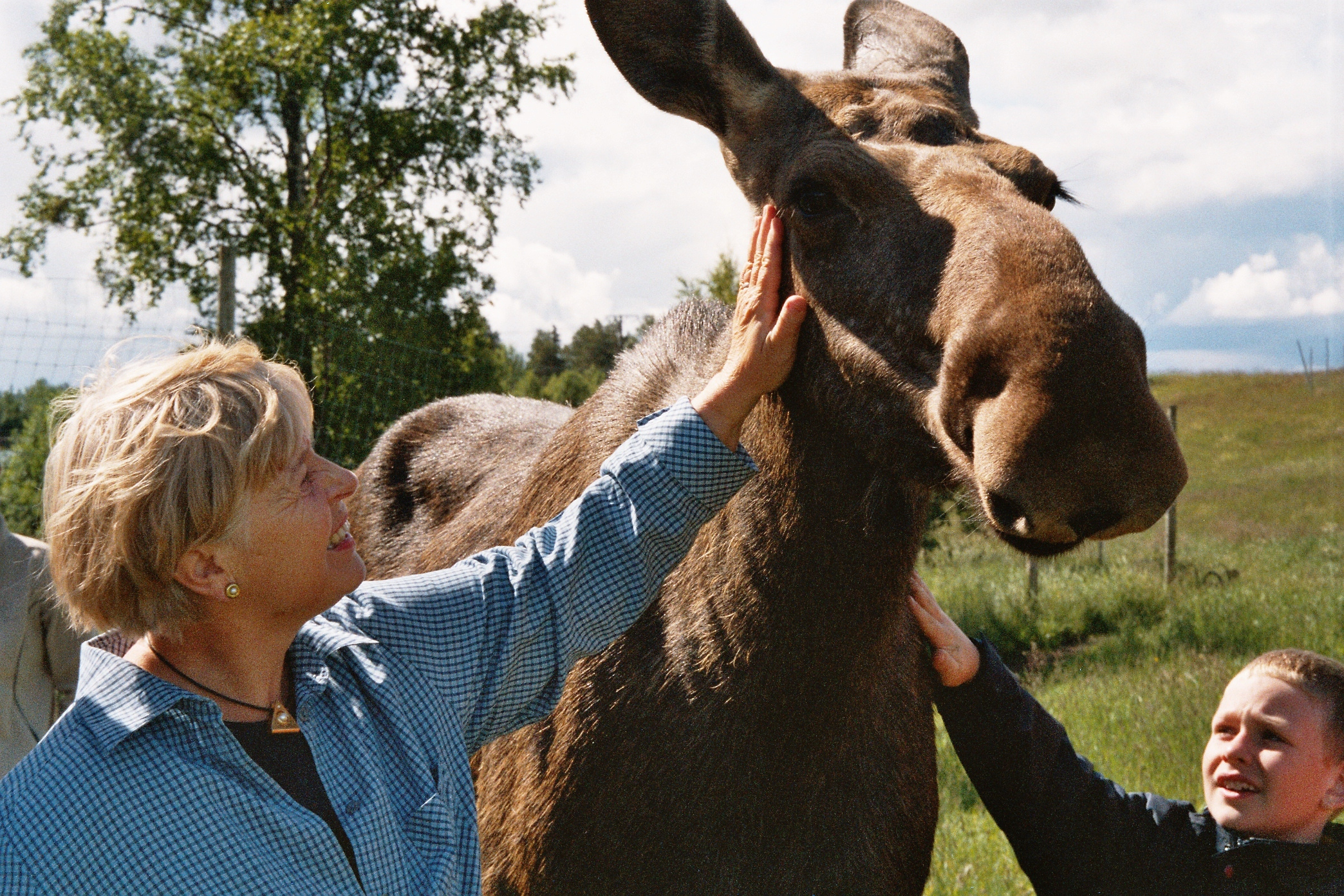
Moose Garden

Lake Storsjön has been trafficked for a long time and the steamships S/S Thomée and S/S Östersund are still in operation every summer. Unlike most boats, they are seen as male and not female. S/S Thomée is the only one that sets sail from Östersund's harbour. S/S Östersund sails from Arvesund, located at Storsjön's western shore but makes visits to Jamtli's steamboat jetty.

Frösö Zoo was one of Sweden's largest zoological gardens with exotic animals. Prior to its closing in 2019, it had roughly 700 animals including Siberian tigers, lions, polar wolves, and monkeys. Frösö Zoo also had a tropical house, a biological museum and an amusement park. Outside of Östersund in the village of Orrviken there is a moose zoo called Moose Garden, allowing close encounters with tame moose.

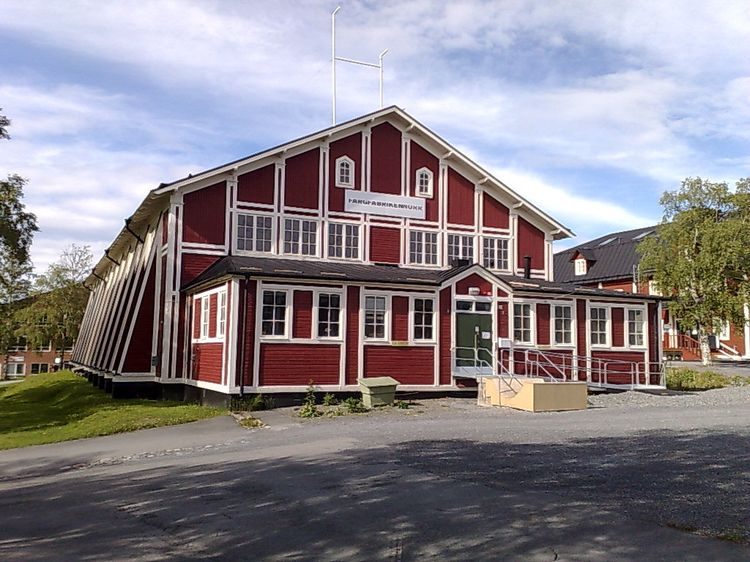
Färgfabriken Norr

Färgfabriken ('the paint factory') is a centre for experimental culture based in Stockholm that portrays itself as a laboratory of contemporary art. A branch named Färgfabriken Norr was established in Östersund between April 2008 and January 2011.

Gaaltije, the centre for South Sami culture, opened in 1999 and is a living source of knowledge for South Sami culture, history and business.

Gamla Tingshuset holds a small cinema, a café, a small venue and practice halls. It is usually a meeting place for the town's youth.

=== Events ===
- The city festival Storsjöyran (referred to as simply Yran, literally meaning: The Great Lake Giddy Festival), the oldest city festival in Scandinavia and with 55,000 visitors every year the largest in Sweden. Storsjöyran is held in the middle of Östersund the last weekend of July. Although the event starts the weekend before with the opening of Krogstråket when regional bars and restaurants gather near the lake.
- Jamtli Christmas Market is well attended market taking place the second weekend of Advent.
- Expo Norr, Sweden's oldest merchandise trade fair held in June with roughly 400 exhibitors.
- Vinterparken ('The Winter Park'), with seasonal lakeside events.

== Media ==
The largest daily newspaper in Östersund is Östersunds-Posten (ÖP) with a circulation of 30,000 copies and the second largest is Länstidningen Östersund (LT) with a circulation of 15,000 copies (2006 for both). Like most Swedish newspaper they each have a political editorial page, views of the Centre Party are expressed in ÖP and views of the Swedish Social Democratic Party are expressed in LT. Länstidningen is unique in Sweden, as it is the only Swedish newspaper with press support that has ever made itself non-dependent on state subsidy. Much of the paper's success is ascribed to the then editor-in-chief awarded with the Grand Journalism Award (Stora Journalistpriset). Since 2006 the newspaper has been dependent on state subsidy. The media group Mittmedia has owned both newspapers since 2005.

Two free daily newspapers exist in the city, 100 procent Östersund and Lokaltidningen Storsjön.

Local radio stations include Radio Jämtland (a part of Sveriges Radio), One FM and Modern Times Group's Rix FM.

== Films shot in Östersund ==
The following feature films have been shot in Östersund:

- Bitter Flowers
- Dunderklumpen
- Marianne
- The American

== Education ==
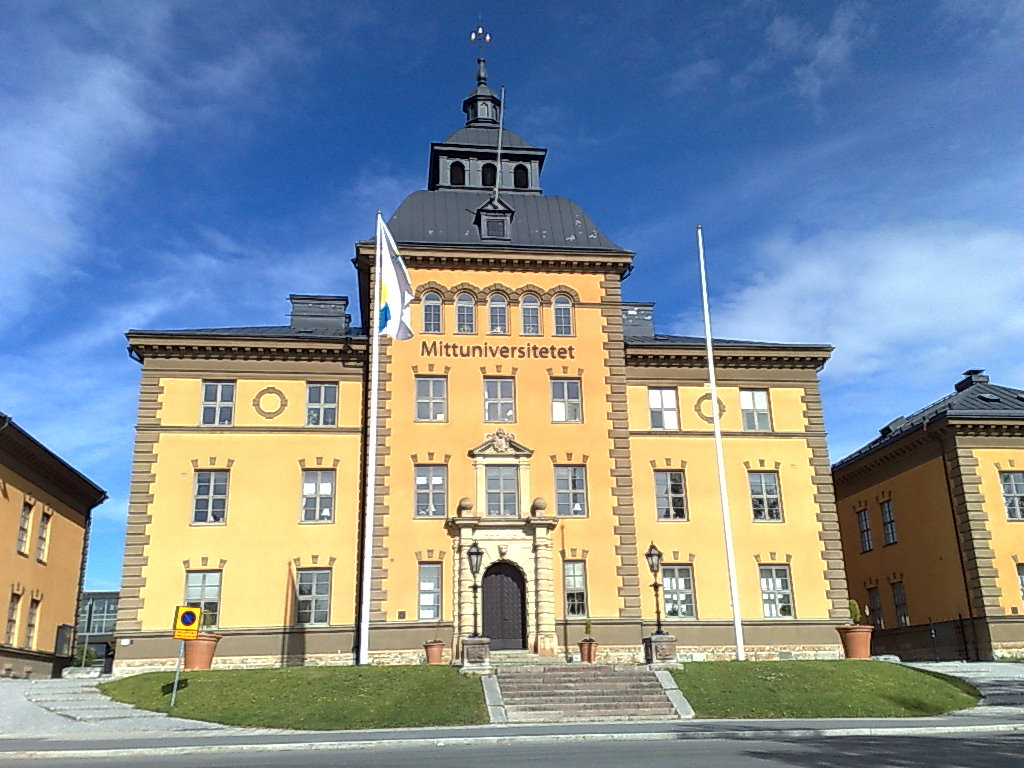
Mid Sweden university in Östersund

Östersund recently became a university city and the Mid Sweden University has its largest campus site in Östersund with well over 7,000 students. The Mid Sweden University was a university college (högskola) named Mitthögskolan until it was granted university status in 2005, making it the youngest university in Sweden. Mitthögskolan was the result of the merger between the University College of Sundsvall/Härnösand (Högskolan i Sundsvall/Härnösand) and the University College of Östersund (Högskolan i Östersund)

Östersund is a centre for the research in social sciences (business administration, psychology, sociology and political science) and social work, whilst the research in Health Sciences is split between Östersund and Sundsvall.

The city has several secondary schools (gymnasieskolor) of which Palmcrantzskolan (PC) and Wargentinsskolan (Wargen) are the two largest. Among the smaller are Storsjögymnasiet, Östersund's gymnasieskola and Dille Gård Naturbruksgymnasium.

== Sports ==
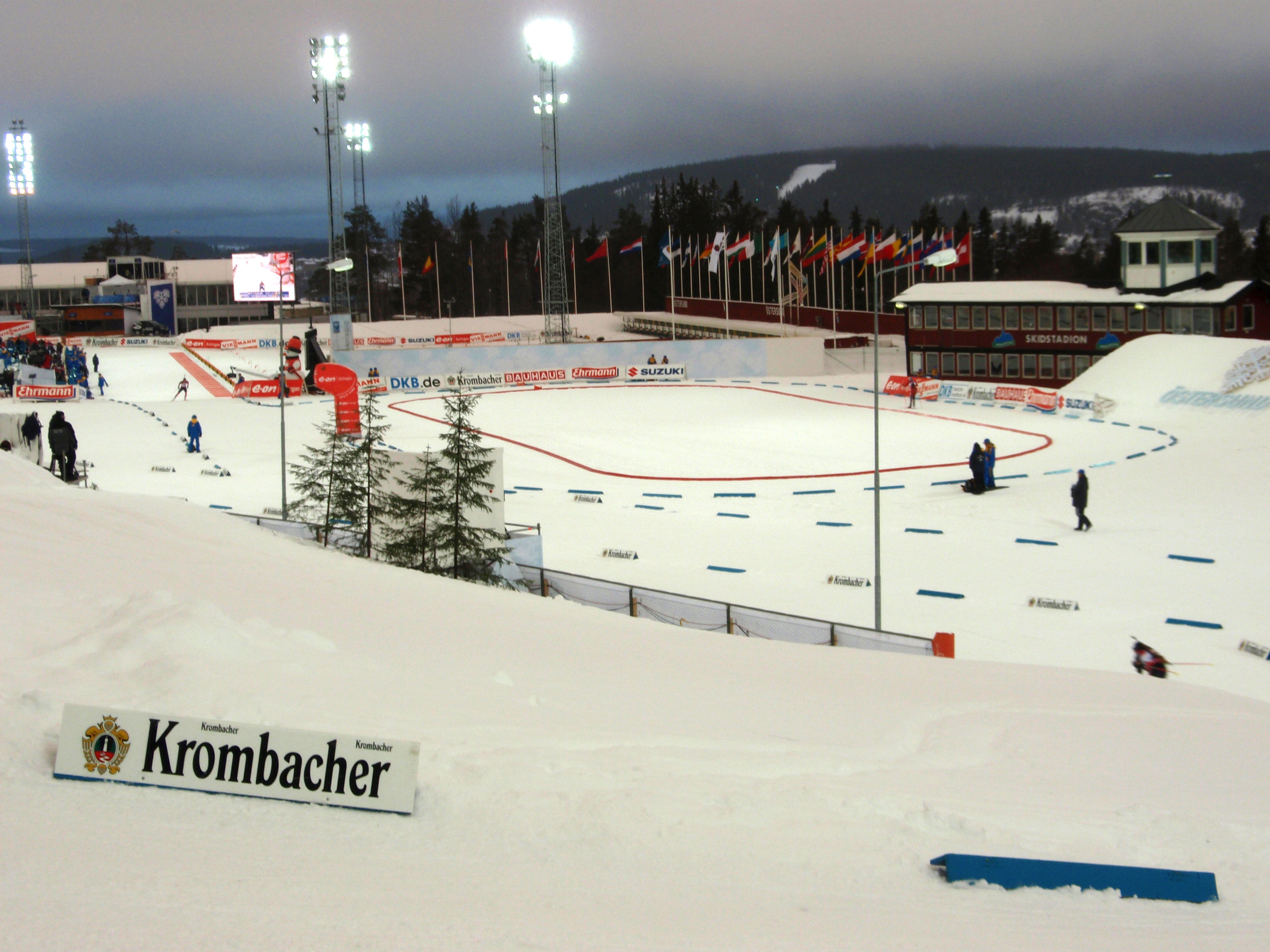
The ski stadium of Östersund

Östersund is marketed as the Winter City and has a long history of winter sports. It is internationally perhaps most known as one of the regular Biathlon World Cup hosts in late-November and early-December. World Cup competitions have been held there since 1989. The Biathlon World Championship 1970 were hosted in Östersund in 1970, 2008 and 2019.

The cross-country skiing stadium is located two kilometres (1.2 miles) from the city centre and is one of the most well-equipped and spectator friendly ski stadiums in Sweden. The stadium is also internationally renowned due to the topography of its ski tracks, the compact track-system and the fact that Östersund is usually quite a reliable locality for snow during the winter months. A number of biathlon world cup races have been held at the stadium as well as several national championships in cross-country skiing.

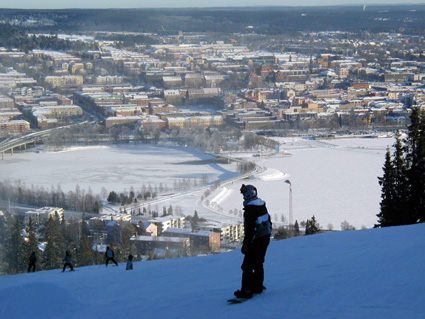
Östersund seen from the piste Gustavsbergsbacken

Nationellt Vintersportcentrum (NVC, Swedish Winter Sports Research Centre) is a research and training project run by the sports movement, the university, the municipality and the county council. The Swedish Olympic Committee (SOC) use its lab for various tests.

Östersund, in association with the neighboring municipality of Åre, had plans to be the candidate of Sweden for the organization of the XXII Olympic Winter Games, the 2014 Winter Olympics, but the candidacy proposal was rejected by the government. It would have been the fourth attempt of this city (after 1994 where Östersund lost the bid with the score 45–39 to Lillehammer in the final round, 1998 and 2002).

Östersund has a basketball team in Sweden's highest division (Ligan), Jämtland Basket.

Östersund's Fallskärmsklubb is the oldest of Sweden's drop zones and was formed in 1958. The very first civilian parachute jump was done actually on the ice of Storsjön in February 1956. The jumpers were officers from the Swedish Parachute rangers regiment that also wanted to jump on their spare time. Östersund's Fallskärmsklubb is today localized to Optand's airfields, approximately 13 km (8 mi) south from Östersund where the education of students and skydiving for experienced jumpers are carried out year-round with the exception of late autumn until early winter.

Other sports clubs include:

- IFK Östersund
- Ope IF
- Östersunds FK
- Fältjägarnas IF

=== 2021 Special Olympics World Winter Games ===
Östersund along with Åre were originally to host the 2021 Special Olympics World Winter Games. It would have marked the first time that Sweden had ever hosted the Special Olympics. However, due to lack of funding on 19 December 2019, the event did not take place in Sweden. Instead it was to take place in Kazan, Russia and was delayed to 2022 but was cancelled following Russia's invasion of Ukraine.

== Notable residents ==
- Alx Danielsson (born 1981), racing driver
- Alexander Edler (born 1986), professional ice hockey defenseman for the Los Angeles Kings
- Emil Fjellström (1884–1944), stage and film actor
- Mathias Fredriksson (born 1973), cross-country skier
- Martin Ponsiluoma (born 1995), biathlete
- Anna Haag (born 1986), cross-country skier
- Rune Hassner (1928–2003) photographer and film director
- Martha Hedman (1883–1974), Swedish-American stage actress
- Emil Jönsson (born 1985), cross-country skier
- Jacob Moverare (born 1998), ice hockey player
- Annika Norlin (born 1977), singer/songwriter for Hello Saferide and Säkert!

== International relations ==
=== Twin towns – Sister cities ===
Östersund is twinned with:

- Trondheim, Norway (since 1946)
- Sanok, Poland

== See also ==
- Storsjön
- Frösön
