= Frösö Zoo =

Former zoo in Sweden

Coordinates: 63.1937°N 14.5810°E

Frösö zoo
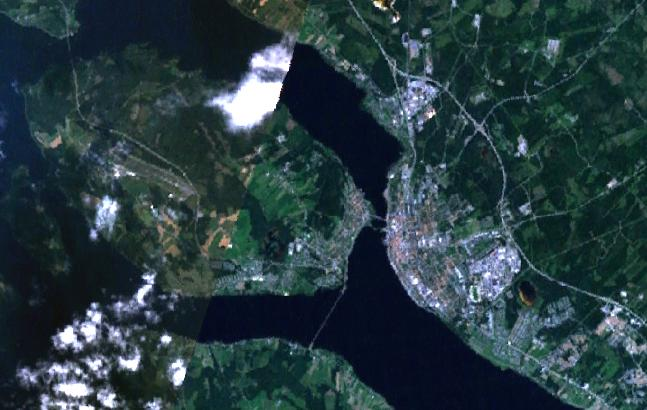
- Frösön and Östersund created with NASA World Wind
- Interactive map of Frösö zoo
- Date opened: 1960
- Land area: 42 hektar
- No. of animals: 700
- No. of species: 52
- Owner: Åke Netterström
- Website: http://www.frosozoo.se

Frösö zoo was a zoo on the island Frösön close to the city of Östersund in Sweden.

Created and owned by Åke Netterström, it covered some 42 hectares and included several species of tropical carnivores and other exotic animal species.

A terrarium which covered 1600 m^{2} exhibited crocodiles, snakes, lizards and different monkeys.

After unsuccessfully trying to sell the zoo, it was reported that the animals would be relocated. Operations shut down in 2019.
