= Torvalla =

- District in Östersund
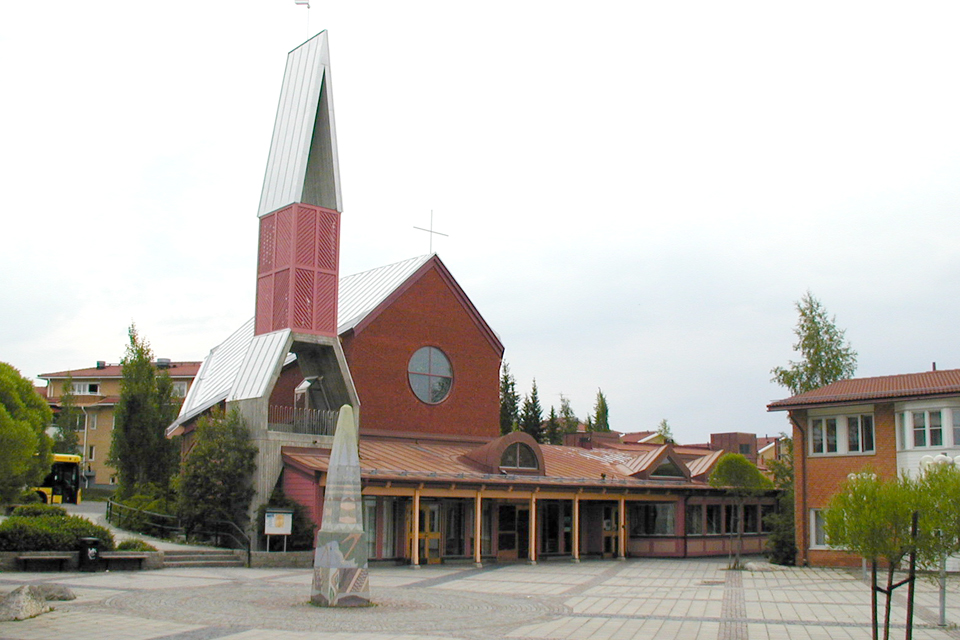
- Heliga Ljusets kyrka (The Holy Light Church) and the small Centrum plaza.
- Interactive map of Torvalla
- Coordinates: 63°09′N 14°45′E
- Country: Sweden
- Municipality: Östersund
- Established: 1980s

Population (2005)
  - Total: 6,489

Torvalla is a city district (Swedish: stadsdel) in southern Östersund, about six kilometres from the city core. The district has a population of around 8000. Torvalla is divided into 3 smaller areas: Fjällmon or Nedre Torvalla (Lower Torvalla), Skogsmon or Övre Torvalla (Upper Torvalla) and Ängsmon or Bortre Torvalla (Farther Torvalla). There is also an industrial area on the other side of the highway (E14) called Verksmon. just south of Fjällmon lies Torvalla by (Torvalla village) which also counts to the district. Torvalla is a relatively young district that began to develop under the Million Programme, however, there were inhabitants in the area before it became a district of Östersund. There are currently four schools in Torvalla:

- Class 1-5: Fjällängsskolan, Mimergården and Ångsmogården (One in each sub-district)
- Class 6-9: Torvallaskolan (In Skogsmon close to Torvalla Centrum)

In Torvalla Centrum there is a grocery store (Coop), health clinich, hairdresser, ATM, pizzeria, clothing store and church. There are also a small library and a Thai takeaway just a few minutes walking distance from the centrum. There are two churches in the district, Heliga Ljusets Kyrka (The Holy Light's Church) and Ängsmokyrkan in Skogsmon and Ängsmon respectively. Östersund's city buses number 4, 6 and 14 all go to Torvalla.

== Gallery ==
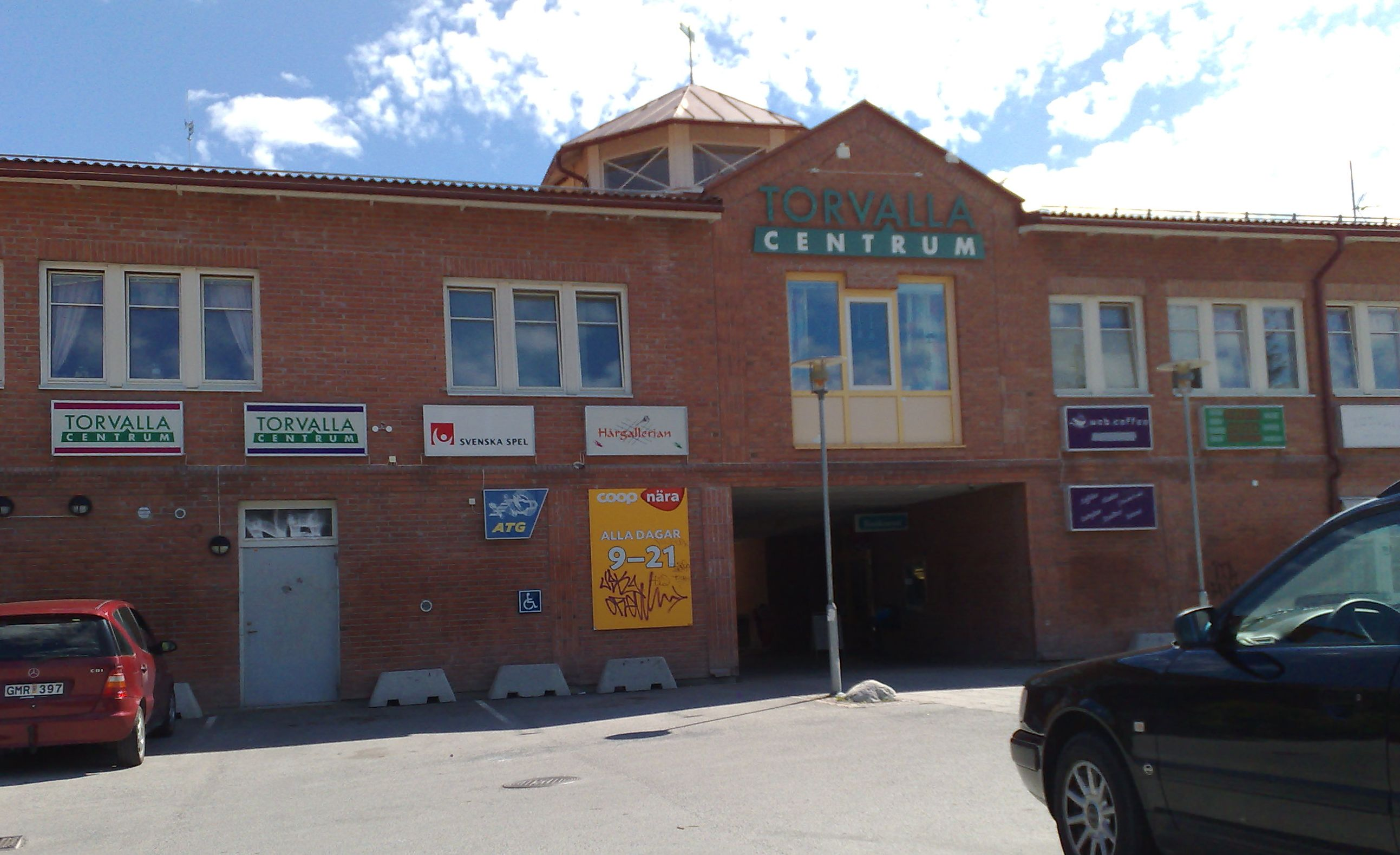
Torvalla Centrum

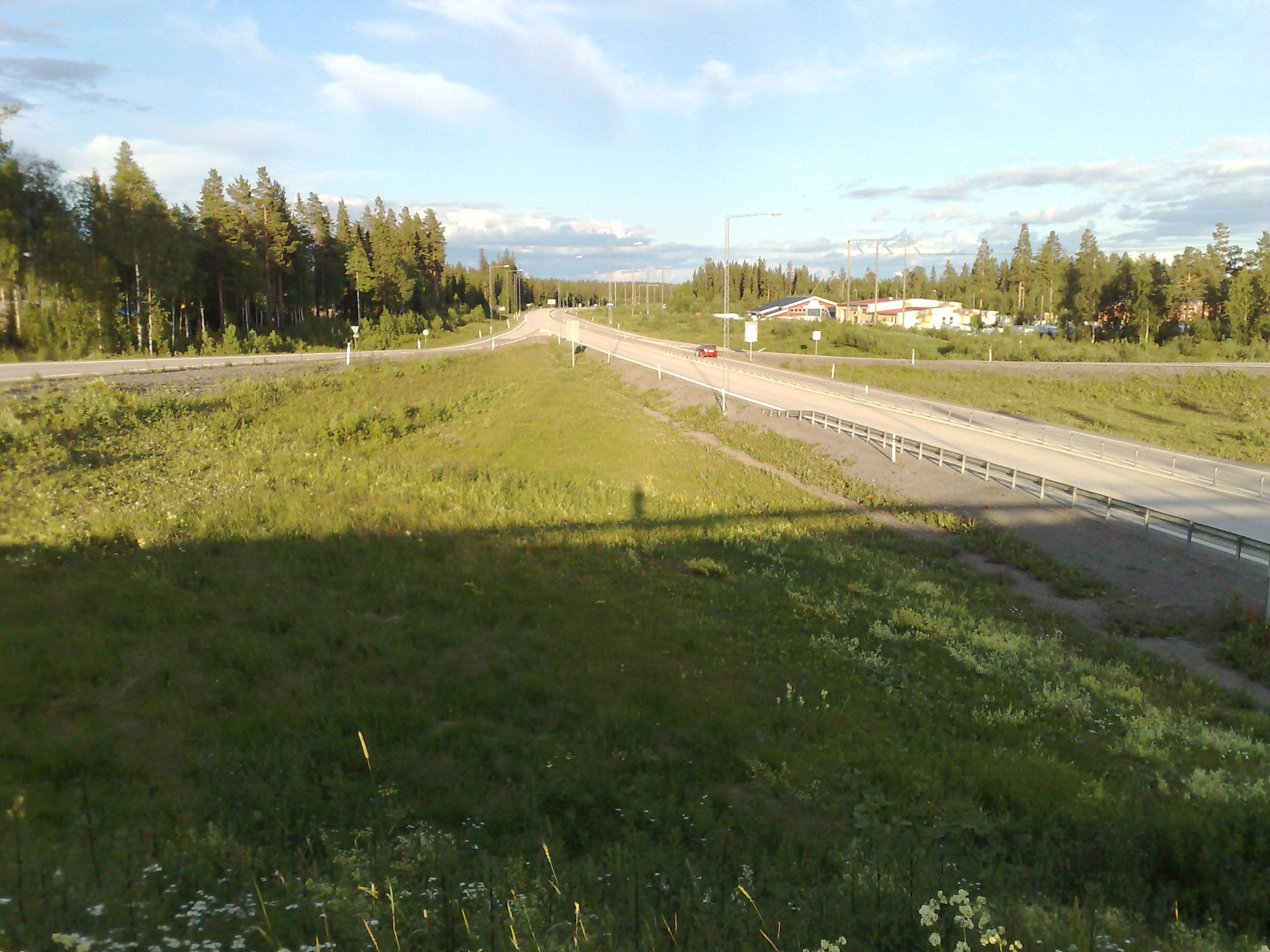
E14, Torvalla to the right
