= Milko (Swedish cooperative) =

Swedish dairy products cooperative

- Type: agricultural cooperative
- Industry: Dairy Products
- Founded: 1991; 35 years ago
- Defunct: 2011
- Successor: Arla Foods; COOP Sverige (Grådö Mejeri)
- Headquarters: Östersund, Sweden
- Area served: Sweden
- Key people: Per Åsling (Chairman)
- Products: over 300, including milk and cheese
- Members: 1000
- Number of employees: 900
- Website: www.milko.se

Milko was a cooperative based in Östersund, Sweden and was Sweden's largest native producer of dairy products.

Milko offered a wide range of products, from milk to cheesecake. One of its most well-known products is Milko Messmör ("Milko Soft Whey Butter"), a kind of butter made out of whey, a by-product produced when making cheese. Messmör is known not only for its unusual taste but also for its high content of minerals such as iron.

Milko's largest competitor was Arla Foods, which traditionally have been Sweden's largest dairy products producer. However, many new grocery store chains such as Willy:s have been found signing contracts with Milko instead of Arla Foods in later years. The director of the dairy in Dalarna is Staffan Eklöv.

In 2011, Milko merged with Arla.
