= Annica Edstam =

Swedish actress and singer

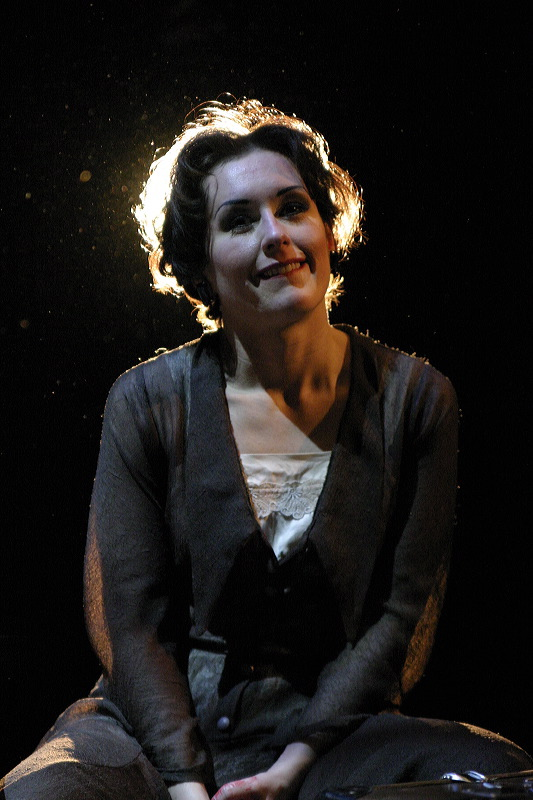
- Annica Edstam, actress
- Born: Annica Katarina Edstam; 22 March 1969 (age 57); Stockholm, Sweden
- Occupations: Actress singer
- Years active: 1996–present
- Website: edstam.com

Annica Edstam (born 22 March 1969) in Stockholm, is a Swedish actress and singer.

== Key theatre credits ==
Year	Role	Production	Director	Theater
1996	Eponine	Les Misérables	Vernon Mound	Wermland Opera
1997	Anne	A Little Night Music	Benny Fredriksson	National Swedish Touring Theatre
1998	Witch	Into The Woods	Erik Fägerborn	Södra Teatern
1999	Good Deeds	Everyman 99	Lars Wassrin	Immanuel Church, Stockholm
1999	Hedvig	Horseraddish Country	Johan Huldt	Teater Västernorrland National Swedish Touring Theatre
2000	Eponine	Les Misérables	Vernon Mound	The Göteborg Opera
2001	Eponine	Les Misérables	Vernon Mound	Malmö Opera
2001	Eliza Doolittle	My Fair Lady	Jan Hertz	Kristianstads Theater
2002	Stephanie Nechrophorus	Nine	Vernon Mound	Malmö Opera
2016	cover Greta Garbo	Garbo The Musical	Scott Faris	Oscarsteatern
2003	Joani	The Full Monty	Marianne Mörck	Stockholm City Theatre
2005	Belle	Beauty and the Beast	Hans Berndtsson	The Göteborg Opera
2005	Rebecka	Rebecka	Catarina Gnospelius	Stora Teatern
2006	Lola Blau	Tonight: Lola Blau	Hans Berndtsson	The Göteborg Opera
2007	Sofia	The Brothers Lionheart	Elisabet Ljungar	The Göteborg Opera
2008	cover Mrs Pearce	My Fair Lady	Tomas Alfredson	Oscarsteatern
2009	Desirée	Benny and the shrimp	Åsa Melldahl	Radioteatern
2010	Charlotte Malcolm	A Little Night Music	Tobias Theorell	Stockholm City Theatre
2011	Fantine	Les Misérables	Ronny Danielsson	Malmö Opera
2012	Mistress	Evita	Linus Thunström	Malmö Opera
2013	The Judges Wife	Carmencita Rockefeller	Rikard Bergqvist	Malmö Opera
2014	Beatrice de Winter	Rebecca	Åsa Melldahl	Malmö Opera
2015	Gulybova och Kubarikha	Doktor Zhivago	Ronny Danielsson	Malmö Opera
2016	Eliza Doolittle	My Fair Lady	Anna Novovic	Malmö Opera
2016-2017	Fosca	Passion	Victoria Brattström	Spira Culture Center/Norrlandsoperan
2018-2022	Florence	Så som i himmelen	Markus Virta	Oscarsteatern
2021-2022	Sister Margaretta and Baroness Elsa Schraeder	The Sound of Music	Ronny Danielsson	Kulturhuset Stadsteatern
2020-2023	Mrs O'Malley and Renaldi	Funny Girl	Ronny Danielsson	Malmö Opera
2025	Lisa's grandmother	Handbok för superhjältar	My Blomqvist	Original cast tour
2025	Mrs Wilkinson	Billy Elliot the Musical	Ola Hörling	Kristianstads teater

== Discography ==
- 1996 Les Misérables
