= Storsjöodjuret =

Lake monster in Swedish folklore

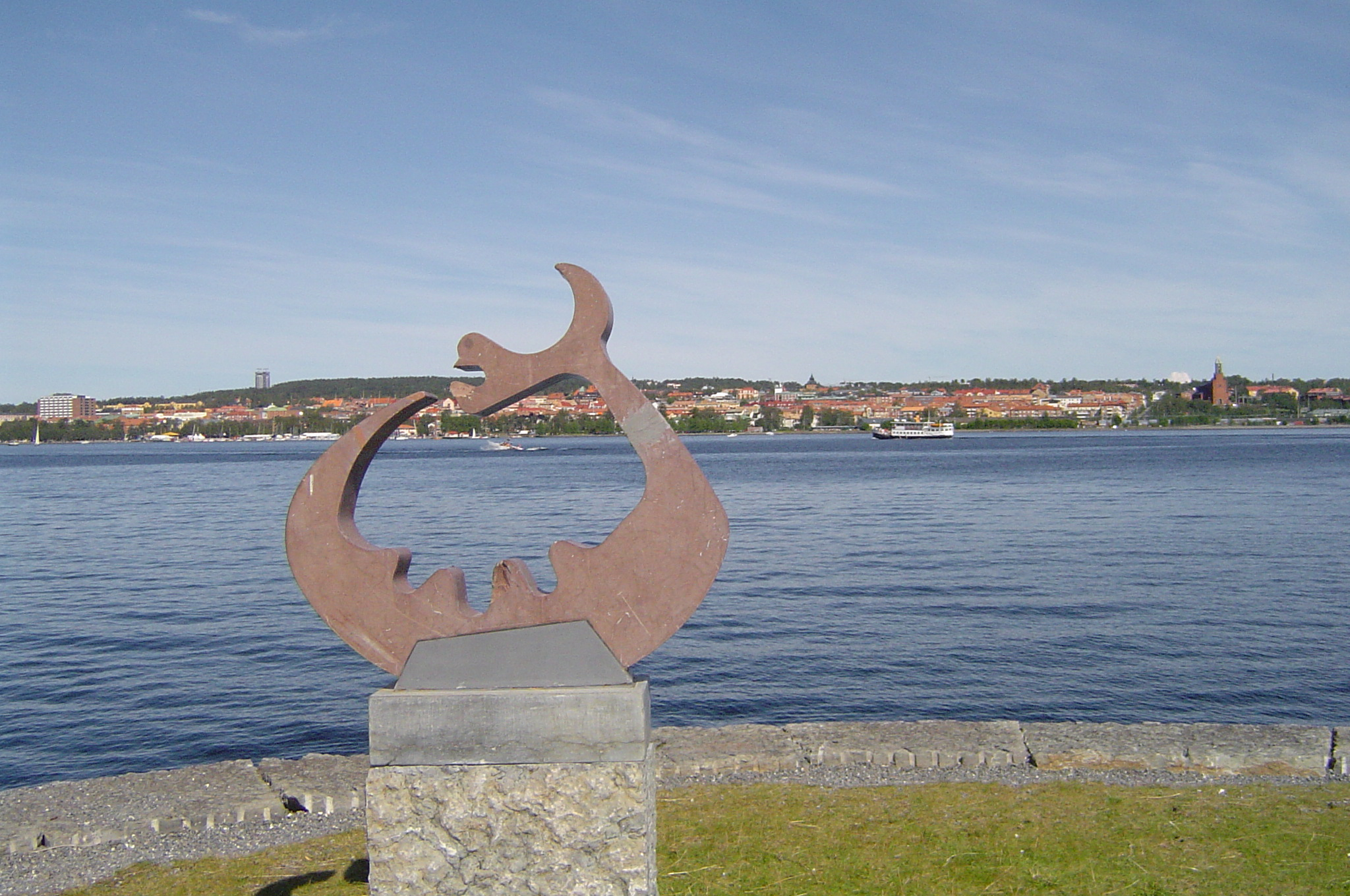
- Storsjöodjuret and Östersund

Creature information
- Other name: Storsie (English)
- Sub grouping: Lake monster
- Folklore: Local legend

Origin
- First attested: 1635
- Country: Sweden
- Region: Storsjön, Jämtland
- Habitat: Water

In Swedish folklore, the Storsjöodjuret (Swedish pronunciation: [ˈstûːrɧøːʊˌjʉːrɛt], literally "The Great-Lake Monster" (Note: Or possibly "great monster of the lake", since Bonniers Lexikon (1966) defines Storsjöodjur as "benämning på stora sjöormen".)) is a lake monster said to live in the 90-metre-deep (300 ft) lake Storsjön in Jämtland, Sweden.

The lake monster is first attested in a 1635 manuscript, according to which the sea/lake serpent (sjöorm) was bound up magically in the lake's depths by Kettil Runske who, according to the story, carved his spell into the Frösö Runestone (Frösön being an island on the lake). Later folk legends circulating locally in Jämtland claimed the monster was a product of tinkering by two trolls, and that it was a cat-headed creature with a black serpentine body.

There have been numerous eyewitness accounts with varying details since the 19th century, with some claiming the alleged animal possesses a dog-like head.

== Name ==
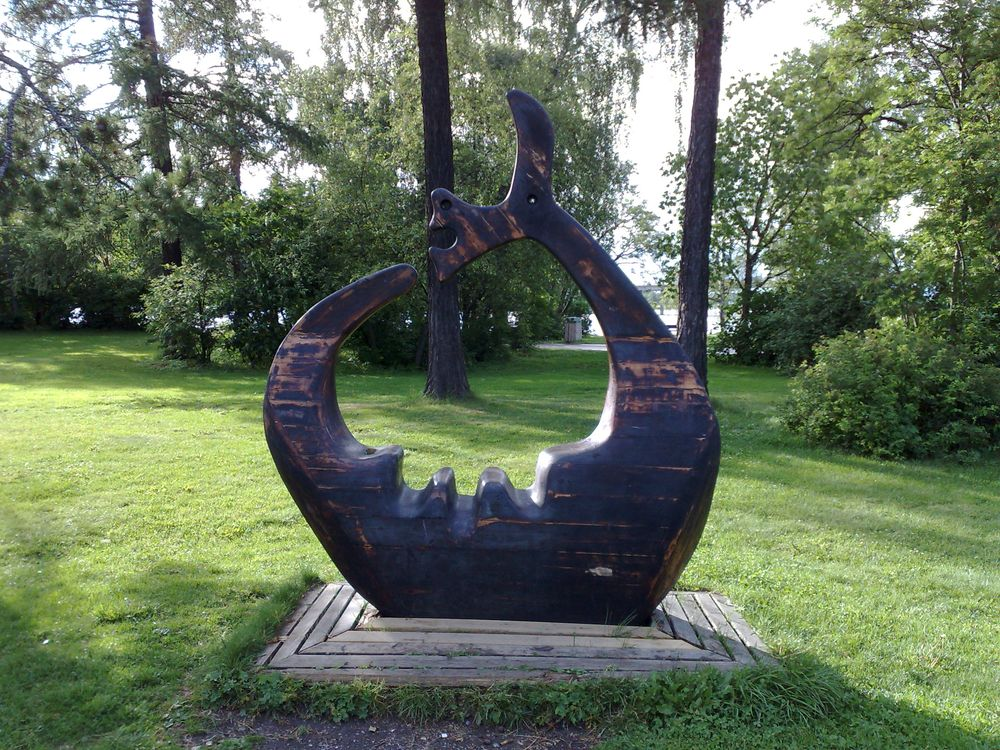
"The Great-Lake Monster"

The monster is popularly referred to as Storsjöodjuret, the noun Storsjöodjur first seeing confirmed use in 1899, (Note: Quennerstedt, August (1 June 1899) Olaus Magnus såsom skildrare af Nordens djurlif is the earliest instance of use given in the Svenska akademiens ordbok, though Olsson (1899) is also listed.) where odjur is a Swedish word for ‘monster’ or ‘large vermin’, literally ‘unanimal’. (Note: Since the o-prefix in Swedish is a negation, like the English "un-".) While Storsjö is the name of a lake (or lakes), storsjö can also be a common noun meaning ‘great-lake’, being the compound of the Swedish stor (‘big’ or ‘great’) and sjö (‘lake’) .

Sometimes it is simply called Storsjödjuret (‘the great-lake animal’). (Note: In the local Jamtish dialect it has been named Storgläffs'n (‘the great yelper’) by a locally known poet. This is, however, not a popularly used name.)

In the English language, Storsjöodjuret is sometimes called 'Storsie', similarly to Nessie, though the names 'Storsjö Monster', Storsjoe Monster, "the monster of Lake Storsjön", and the literal translation "The Great Lake Monster" are used. Its Latin name is Hydogiganta monstruidae jemtlandicum. It has also been called Storsjöormen (‘The Great Lake Serpent’).

== Legends ==
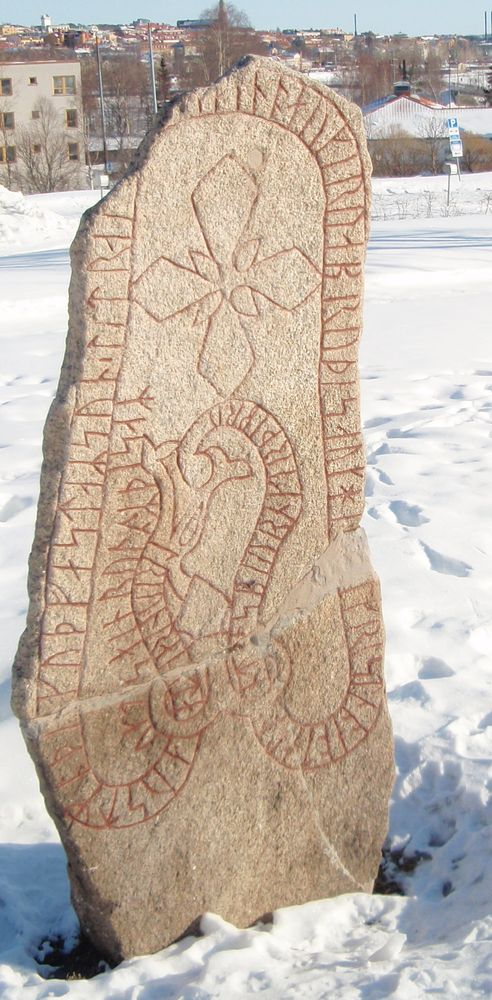
The Frösö Runestone from the mid 11th century. In the legend from 1635, Storsjöodjuret is said to be the serpent depicted on the stone.

=== 17th century attestations ===
The earliest description of a sea/lake-serpent (sjöorm) inhabiting Storsjön can be found in a manuscript by Morten Pedersen Herdal dated to 1635. This text attributed the feat of binding the serpent to the bottom of the lake to legendary runemaster Kettil Runske who, according to the narrative, carved a magic spell into the Frösö Runestone on the island of Frösö. (Note: Paragraph quoted or paraphrased from the Morten Pedersen Herdal ms. of 1635, requoted by Enqvist and by Wall.) (Note: The spelling "Pederson" is given by 19th and 20th century sources, but the identification of the manuscript is cited by them to Sandvig (1779) Samlinger til den Danske Historie, which gives "Pedersen" (and "Kield Runske" for the rune-master's name).) (Note: Ole Worm in the near contemporaneous commentary on the runestone remarks on a similar legend citing Saxo, but does not name the wizard (Magus).)

A version of the legend was also recorded in the group of writings associated with the Rannsakningar efter antikviteter (‘Researches into Antiquities’), (Note: Ståhle (1960) Rannsakningar efter antikviteter, Bd. 1, H. 1, p. 257, apud K. G. Ljunggren's review.) specifically in a piece dated 1685 by Anders Plantin (Andreas Plantinus): (Note: The Rannsakningar was the Swedish crown's effort during the 17th century to catalogue objects of antiquities. Anders Plantin was a häradshövding or district circuit judge.)

"It is said that beneath this [rune]stone lies a dreadfully large head of a serpent and that the body stretches over Storsjön to Knytta village and Hille Sand (Note: Hillsand perhaps(?), which is a village farther north in Jämtland.) where the tail is buried. The serpent was called a rå and therefore shall this stone be raised. Since no one peacefully could cross [Storsjön], the ferryman and his wife states, along with many others, that in the last turbulent time this stone was torn down and broken in two. As long as this stone lay on the ground many strange things occurred in the water, until the stone was raised and assembled anew".

The Frösö stone has a large serpent depicted on it, but there is neither a reference to it nor to Kettil Runske in the text itself, which instead tells of Guðfastr's son Austmaðr's christening of Jämtland and the construction of the Frösö Bridge, though the stone has indeed been broken into two pieces.

=== Folktale ===
The folk-legend that circulated around the Jämtland region provided additional details. According to this lore, two trolls named Jata and Kata were on Storsjön's shore long ago, each one brewing his cauldron at the lake for "days, weeks and months", until at last was heard "a groaning sound as if from a sick child" followed by a "loud bang.. as if by a violent thunderclap", and out of one cauldron leapt a strange creature with a black serpent-like body and a cat-like head, which disappeared into the lake (the trolls and the cauldrons vanished as well in a wisp of white smoke, leaving a gaping abyss). The monster dwelling in the lake became a menace to the surrounding areas, and grew to such an immense scale as to encircle the entire island of Frösön, ultimately becoming capable of biting its own tail. To subdue the creature, Ketil Jamte bound the beast by carving spells into a stone that was erected on the east shore of Frösön. Parts of the beast were still visible above the water-line, but it is warned that it could be liberated at some point in the future when someone deciphers the runestone.

The name of the hero may be Ketil Jamte or Ketil Ruske depending on the version. According to one writer, the runemaster was named Gudfast, which draws a connection to the legendary Austmann Gudfastsson (Austmaðr, Guðfastar son, aforementioned, inscribed on the runestone).

== Eyewitness accounts ==
There have been hundreds of recorded sightings of Storsjöodjuret dating back to the 19th century. Newspapers reported in July 1857 that workers at the Forssbacka bruk (iron mill) spotted a creature with a head "black and gleaming" from a distance. They further alleged its head was about the size of a large cat's(Swedish: större katthufwud), with the water movement purportedly suggesting an anatomy similar to that of a sea serpent.

Peter Olsson published an 1899 booklet documenting 22 eyewitness testimonies and collated the details in his summary. (Note: Olsson's book contains many illustrations of sea-serpents from other sources, but not any of Storsjöodjuret; the cover drawing is the head portion close-up of the sea-serpent reported by the English ship Daedalus.) Olsson, a naturalist, concluded that the most likely match was some aquatic mammal that had yet to be identified.

The monster has been reported by various witnesses to measure on the order of 10 metres (33 ft) in length, with Olsson's accounts ranging from 3.5 to 14 metres (11 to 46 ft) (Note: Converted from the Swedish fot, foot or aln, cubit.)

It purportedly had a snake-like body and long neck, with some describing a dog-like head, potentially implying visible ears, atypical of a serpent. Some accounts, however, describe the creature as finned, with some resultant ambiguity as to whether the ostensible auricular features would actually be fins instead of ears. Some observers have reported several humps (Swedish: pucklar) on its back, but Olsson lumped these cases together with "vertical" curvings or undulations (Swedish: buckter).

=== Capture campaign ===
Popular interest in the creature was first sparked in the 1890s. After several sightings, an expedition was organized by locals to catch the monster in 1894, even obtaining the sponsorship of King Oscar II. The failed attempt was featured in a satirical cartoon by Albert Engström in the Strix magazine.

=== Film footage ===
In August 2008, a film crew claimed to have captured Storsjöodjuret on film, reporting that infrared cameras allegedly revealed an endothermic mass in the lake.

=== Protected status ===
The only city located by Storsjön, Östersund, celebrated its 200-year anniversary in 1986. That year, the Jämtland county administrative board declared Storsjöodjuret to be an endangered species and Storsjöodjuret, along with its offspring and nest, became protected by law. The law was revoked in 2005, with the Parliamentary Ombudsman (JO/Justitieombudsmannen) spearheading the criticism. (Note: Sandelin (2014), citing Berggren (2004), recte Berggren (2005).)

== Citations ==
Notes

Bibliography

- Berggren, Niels-Olof (2005-11-09), Länsstyrelsen i Jämtlands län har i en föreskrift beslutat om fridlysning av Storsjöodjuret. Fråga om föreskriftens rättsliga verkan [The County Administrative Board of Jämtland County has in a regulation decided on the protection of the Great Lake Beast. Ask about the legal effect of the regulation] (PDF) (in Swedish)
- Enqvist, Arvid (1938). "Runstenen på Frösön och den bundna sjöormen. Ett bidrag till Kättil Runske-sägnens utbredning". Rig (in Swedish). 21: 157–168.
- Meurger, Michel [in French]; Gagnon, Claude (1988) [1982], Lake Monster Traditions: A Cross-cultural Analysis, London: Fortean Tomes, ISBN 9781870021005
- Olsson, Peter [in Swedish] (1899). Storsjöodjuret : framställning af fakta och utredning (in Swedish). Östersund: Jämtlandspostens boktryckeri.. PDF via SELIBR 1645112
- Ståhle, Carl Ivar, redact. [in Swedish] (1960). Olsson, Ingemar; Stahre, Nils-Gustaf [in Swedish]; Ståhle, Carl Ivar [in Swedish] (eds.). Rannsakningar efter antikviteter. Vol. Bd. 1. Stockholm: Kungl. Vitterhets-, historie- och antikvitetsakad. p. 257.
- Welinder, Stig [in Swedish] (2004), "Storsjöodjurets arkeologi, biologi och mytologi", in Berggren, Åsa; Arvidsson, Stefan; Hållans, Ann-Mari (eds.), Minne och myt: konsten att skapa det förflutna (in Swedish), Nordic Academic Press, pp. 201–212, ISBN 9789189116757
