= Karin Branzell =

Swedish operatic contralto (1891–1974)

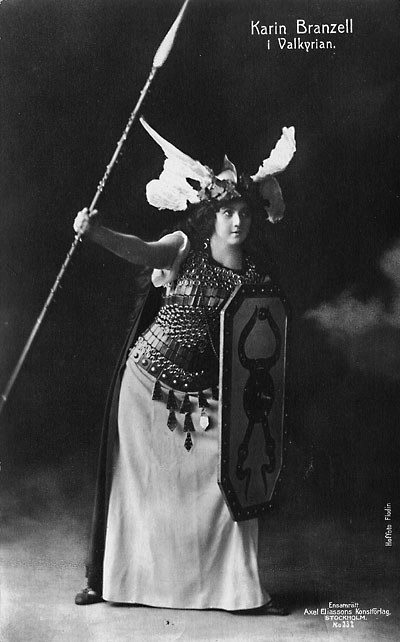
Branzell in Die Walküre

Karin Branzell (24 September 1891 – 15 December 1974) was a Swedish operatic contralto (sometimes described as a mezzo-soprano), who had a prominent career at the Metropolitan Opera, New York, and in Europe. Her very wide range enabled her to sing both contralto roles and the occasional soprano role. She was particularly noted for her singing of the music of Richard Wagner, in roles such as Ortrud (Lohengrin), Venus (Tannhäuser), Erda (Das Rheingold and Siegfried), Brangäne (Tristan und Isolde), and Brunnhilde (Die Walküre). She was considered on a par with Margarete Klose and Kerstin Thorborg as a Wagnerian contralto. Amneris (Aida), Dalila (Samson et Dalila), Herodias (Salome), and Clytemnestra (Elektra) were among her other renowned roles.

== Biography ==
Karin Maria Branzell was born in Stockholm, Sweden, on 24 September 1891. She initially trained as an organist, and was engaged as assistant organist at the Hjorthagen Church in Stockholm from 1910 to 1913. She studied singing with Tekla Hofer and acting with Elisabeth Hjortberg in her native city. Her debut was at the Royal Theatre in Stockholm as Prince Sarvilaka in Eugen d'Albert's Izeyl, in the 1912–13 season. That year she also sang Nancy in Martha and Amneris in Aida. Her other teachers were Anna Eugénie Schön-René (a pupil of Pauline Viardot), Louis Bachner in Berlin, and Enrico Rosati in New York. She sang at the Royal Theatre 1913–18, and at the Berlin State Opera from 1920 to 1934, where she created the role of the Nurse in the Berlin première of Die Frau ohne Schatten under the composer, Richard Strauss, and was also heard as Azucena (Il trovatore), Laura (La Gioconda), Fides (Le prophète), Dalila (Samson et Dalila) and Carmen. She also appeared at the Royal Opera, Covent Garden in 1935, 1937 and 1938. She sang there alongside Charles Kullman, Alexander Kipnis and Elisabeth Rethberg, as Konchakovna in a German-language version of Alexander Borodin's Prince Igor, conducted by Sir Thomas Beecham.

She first appeared at the Metropolitan Opera on 6 February 1924, singing Fricka in Die Walküre, and sang there every season until 1944. She returned for a farewell season in 1951, singing Erda in Rudolf Bing's first Ring cycle She sang a total of 412 performances of 21 roles with the Met. During one performance of Die Walküre (27 January 1925), Julia Claussen, the Brünnhilde (also a Contralto/Mezzo-Soprano), was unable to sing Act III, having come to "contralto grief" (i.e. strained her voice) on the high notes of the battle cry at the beginning of Act II. Branzell, who was singing Fricka in the performance (the character appears only in Act II), returned to the stage as Brünnhilde and finished the opera. Three of her students – Nell Rankin, Jean Madeira and Mignon Dunn – distinguished themselves at the Met.

Her other appearances included the Munich State Opera, the Colon Theatre, Buenos Aires, the Bayreuth Festival (1930–31), Florence, and San Francisco (1941).

In 1934–35, she sang the contralto role in the Philadelphia Orchestra's first performance of Gustav Mahler's Kindertotenlieder, under Leopold Stokowski.

In 1936 she was appointed a singer to the Swedish Court (Hovsångerska), and was elected a member of the Swedish Academy of Music in 1937. On 17 February 1949, she and Ellen Faull sang in the first Chicago performance of Mahler's Symphony No. 2 Resurrection, under Fritz Busch.

Karin Branzell sang the contralto/mezzo parts in all of Wagner's operas, some of Verdi's, as well as Herodias and Clytemnestra in Richard Strauss's Salome and Elektra, the Kostelniczka in Leoš Janáček's Jenůfa and Wilhelm Peterson-Berger's Arnljot, and many other roles. She often sang with Lauritz Melchior, who became her lifelong friend and who considered her an unmatched Brangäne in Tristan and Isolde and an unforgettable Fricka and Ortrud. She sang Venus to Melchior's Tannhäuser at his Metropolitan Opera debut, and Brangäne with Melchior and Kirsten Flagstad in 1938. Unlike Melchior, she defended Flagstad when she was accused of not speaking out about the Nazi occupation of Norway.

After retirement from the opera stage, Karin Branzell taught at the Juilliard School in New York, and gave a number of lieder recitals.

She died in Altadena, California, on 15 December 1974, aged 81. Her death was due to an embolism while recovering from a pelvic fracture.

== Recordings ==
Karin Branzell made a number of recordings of opera, operetta and lieder, and she appears on The Record of Singing. As part of her performances at the Metropolitan Opera, she was captured by those who recorded the broadcasts. She appears in a complete Das Rheingold with Friedrich Schorr under Artur Bodanzky in 1937. That same year she appeared in Lohengrin with René Maison and Kirsten Flagstad with the Met Orchestra under Maurice Abravanel. In 1939 she appeared Magdalena in Die Meistersinger von Nürnberg with Schorr and Charles Kullman, with the Met Orchestra under Erich Leinsdorf (9 days after Bodanzky's death). She also recorded a program of lieder with the baritone Mack Harrell, father of the cellist Lynn Harrell.

== Sources ==
- Grove's Dictionary of Music and Musicians, 5th ed, 1954
