= The Brothers Lionheart =

Children's novel by Astrid Lindgren

- First edition
- Author: Astrid Lindgren
- Original title: Bröderna Lejonhjärta
- Illustrator: Ilon Wikland
- Language: Swedish
- Genre: Children's literature Fantasy; Portal fantasy
- Publisher: Rabén & Sjögren
- Publication date: 1973
- Publication place: Sweden
- Pages: 227 pp
- ISBN: 91-29-40865-2
- OCLC: 2012524
- LC Class: PZ59.L47 B7

The Brothers Lionheart (Swedish: Bröderna Lejonhjärta) is a children's fantasy novel written by Astrid Lindgren. Well established as one of the most widely read and beloved books for children in Sweden, it was originally published in the autumn of 1973 and has since been translated into 46 languages. Like several of Lindgren's works, the book has a melancholic tone, and many of its themes are unusually dark for the children's book genre. Disease, death, tyranny, betrayal, and rebellion form the backdrop of the story, against which are contrasted platonic love, loyalty, sacrifice, hope, courage, and pacifism.

The two main characters are two brothers: the brave and popular Jonatan and his admiring younger brother, Karl. The two brothers' surname is originally Lion, though the courageous Jonatan is known as "Lionheart". Karl's nickname is Skorpan (Rusky) since Jonatan loves these typical Swedish toasts or crusts as much as he loves his little brother.

The introduction of the story depicts a small apartment in an impoverished area of Sweden, where Skorpan is bedridden with tuberculosis and, the reader is given to understand, unlikely to survive. Jonatan seeks to comfort his little brother by telling him about Nangijala, a land beyond death, where there are "sagas and campfires". Jonatan dies while saving his brother from a fire, by jumping with his brother on his back out of a 3 storey building, leaving his brother alone. Soon after, Skorpan dies from his disease, and is reunited with Jonatan in Nangijala, where he, too, will be named Lionheart. The brothers experience adventures: together with a resistance group, they join the struggle against the tyrant Tengil, who rules with the aid of the fearsome fire-breathing dragon, Katla. These adventures form the greater part of the book.

To older readers, the book is deliberately ambiguous about how much of the plot is in fact real, keeping open a possibility that it represents Skorpan's fever dreams and imagination, based on the hopeful stories told to him by his brother.

== Plot ==
In an unnamed Swedish city, ten year-old Karl Lejon has found out that he is going to die from an unspecified pulmonary disease (most likely tuberculosis). His adored big brother, 13-year-old Jonatan, calms him down and tells him that in the afterlife, all people will go to a land known as Nangijala.

One day, a fire breaks out in the Lejon home. Jonatan takes Karl on his back and jumps out of the house's window to save him, but dies himself in the fall. Karl is crestfallen over his brother's death, until, just before his own demise, he receives a sign which allays his fears of death. When he wakes again, he finds himself in the Cherry Valley of Nangijala, where he is happily reunited with Jonatan. Karl is introduced to the denizens of the valley, particularly Sofia the dove-keeper, Hubert the hunter, and Jossi, a landlord, and assumes the surname Lionheart along with his brother.

Despite first appearances, not all is truly at peace in Nangijala. The adjacent valley, the Thorn Rose Valley, is suppressed by a tyrant named Tengil, his army and a female dragon named Katla, who is controlled by Tengil through a trumpet. The people of the Cherry Valley, led by Sofia, are aiding the resistance movement in the Thorn Rose Valley, but they know someone from the Cherry Valley is helping Tengil, as Sofia's white doves, which transport secret messages between the valleys, are being shot. Soon after Karl's arrival, Jonatan leaves to assist the Thorn Rose people. Prompted by a nightmare in which he sees Jonatan in danger, Karl follows him in the middle of the night, but while hiding in a cave, he witnesses a clandestine exchange between two of Tengil's soldiers and Jossi, who has turned traitor to his people.

Soon after Jossi leaves, Karl is discovered by the soldiers and taken to the Thorn Rose Valley after claiming that he lives there with his grandfather. After arriving at a village, Karl throws himself into the arms of the first old man he encounters when he sees white doves with him, and surprisingly the old man - by the name of Mattias - takes him in without question. It turns out that Mattias is part of the Thorn Valley resistance and a friend of Jonatan, who is hiding in his house. Jonatan, a hero among the Thorn Rose Valley people, is intent on freeing Orvar, the leader of the Thorn Valley resistance movement who is kept in the cave of Karmanjaka near the Karma Falls, where Katla dwells, with his release sparking the long-anticipated final uprising against Tengil.

The Lionheart Brothers soon depart for Karmanjaka and manage to release Orvar moments before he is to be collected and fed to Katla, but their escape is soon discovered. They ride back as fast as they can towards the Karma Falls, but the pursuing soldiers start overtaking Karl and Jonatan. Karl throws himself off the horse and hides so that Jonatan and Orvar can escape, but soon afterwards he encounters Sofia and Hubert, who are being led into a trap by Jossi. Karl denounces Jossi as the traitor, and while trying to escape by boat, Jossi is carried by the river's current to the Karma Falls, where he perishes.

The Thorn Rose people rise and engage Tengil's forces in battle, but Tengil calls Katla, who begins to decimate the rebels' ranks, including Hubert and Mattias. Jonatan manages to snatch the trumpet from Tengil and bring Katla under his control, compelling her to kill Tengil. Considering Katla an ever-lingering danger despite her current docility, the people decide to get rid of her once and for all, and Jonatan and Karl volunteer for this task. They lure the dragon to Karmanjaka, where they intend to seal her inside her cave to be weakened by starvation. While navigating the treacherous path, Jonatan loses the trumpet, which frees Katla from his control and drives her into chasing them. The Lionheart Brothers barely escape with their lives when an ancient lindworm, Karm, suddenly rises from the waters and engages Katla in mortal combat, which ends with the two monsters killing each other.

Jonatan and Karl set up a camp for the night, and Jonatan explains that during their flight he was burned by Katla's fire and that he will get paralyzed as a result, and he does not want to live like that. When Jonatan can move only his arms, he tells Karl about the land that lies after Nangijala called Nangilima, a land of light where there are only happy adventures. Karl does not want to be separated again from his brother, so he carries him on his back to a cliffdrop. Karl makes the jump, vowing never to be afraid again, but is cut off as they reach the bottom of the gorge. Then the narrative jump-cuts to Karl crying out jubilantly: "Oh, Nangilima! Yes, Jonatan, yes – I see the light! I see the light!"

== Writing process ==
In 1946 Astrid Lindgren released the novel Mästerdetektiven Blomkvist (Bill Bergson, Master Detective) where the knight games between the Red and the White rose is an important element. Mio, My Son, published in 1954, is another story by Lindgren which takes place in a far away medieval land.

The origins of the book have been described by Lindgren several times. A train trip along the lake Fryken, south of Torsby, on a winter's day in 1972, displayed a fantastic dawn which gave her the impulse to write of a land far away. In her words: "It was one of those fantastic mornings with pink light over the lake - yes, it was something of unearthly beauty, and I suddenly got a strong experience, a sort of vision of the dawning light of humanity, and I felt something lit inside. This may turn into something, I thought".

During a visit at a cemetery in Vimmerby, Lindgren was caught by an iron cross with the text Here rest the young brothers Johan Magnus and Achates Phalen, dead 1860. It gave her the inspiration to write a story with two young brothers and death, in her words: "Then I knew suddenly that my next book would be about death and about these two small brothers".

Another inspiration was when, during a press conference for the film of Emil i Lönneberga in 1971, she saw how the young lead character actor Jan Ohlsson got in the lap of his older brother Dick.

== Reception ==
The novel was favourably reviewed, but did receive some criticism, particularly on the issue of death and suicide, and supposedly recommending suicide as a solution to all problems. Many critics, though, hailed it as a major achievement, including some of those who voiced criticism pertaining to its treatment of death.

There is only one way to become free from the illness and that is for younger brother Skorpan (Karl) to take Jonatan on his back and jump from a cliff to die. In the death land of Nangilima eternal happiness reigns. [...] Of course it would be strange for me to point a finger at her (Astrid Lindgren's) imagination, but I cannot help wondering about how a handicapped child may experience Jonatan Lionheart's death wishes. Perhaps a sense of apathy would grow like a fire around the children's heart. Pondering on life-entitlement and life-quality. - Gunnel Enby in Aftonbladet, December 16, 1973. (originally in Swedish)

But the subjectively emotional, often ecstatic tone of Karl's first-person narrative may make young readers uneasy; the book's preoccupation with death and its hints about transmigration of souls may be confusing; and the final, cool acceptance of suicide, too shocking. - Ethel L. Heins in The Horn Book Magazine, Boston, December 1975, p. 594-595.

Other critics believed that Lindgren painted the tale in a very black and white world:

Would this world view, with its romantic-deterministic dream fit better in the Cold War era? Is not this beautiful tale about the fair freedom fighter against an unexplained metaphysical evil an insult to liberation movements around the world? - Kerstin Stjärne in the socialist paper Arbetet, 26 October 1973 (originally in Swedish)

On the other hand, readers reacted largely positive: It is clear that children had a great wish for tales and preferably these kind of exciting tales. Right now I am swamped with letters from children - from several countries - that love the Brothers Lionheart. Never before have I received such a strong and spontaneous reaction on any book. - letter written by Lindgren in 1975. The contrasts, the evocative storyline and the themes of yearning for comfort, of brotherly affection, loyalty and struggle for freedom went over well with a wide readership that was often familiar with Tolkien's The Lord of the Rings and with folktales, and in many ways Lindgren's novel is an example of what Tolkien described as inspiration drawn from "the deeper folktale" (in On Fairy-Stories) and the cathartic, poignant power of such stories.

== Adaptations ==
In 1977, the book was made into the Swedish fantasy film The Brothers Lionheart. The film was directed by Olle Hellbom and adapted for screenplay by Astrid Lindgren herself. Since 1985, an extended version of the film has been regularly shown on Swedish television.

In 2007, the book was adapted into a musical by Bo Wastesson (music), Staffan Götestam (manuscript - coincidentally, Staffan played Jonatan in the 1977 film adaptation) and Ture Rangstrom (lyrics), directed by Elisabet Ljungar at the Gothenburg opera house in Sweden, with the leading parts played by Hanna Brehmer (Skorpan), Alexander Lycke (Jonathan) and Annica Edstam (Sofia), orchestra conducted by Marit Strindlund, choreography created by Camilla Ekelof, costume and stage design by Mathias Clason. The musical opened on March 3, 2007.

In 2009, the book was adapted into a musical by Richard Storry and Pete Gallagher. The UK premiere of this adaptation of The Brothers Lionheart formed part of the Pleasance Theatre's Summer 2009 Programme.

Another film adaptation was in development since 2012, to be directed by Tomas Alfredson. Norwegian Film Institute reported that the film's budget was to be 325 million SEK, making the project the most expensive Nordic film of all time, and so requiring some foreign investors. Alfredson was expected to work together with writer John Ajvide Lindqvist and cinematographer Hoyte van Hoytema, with whom he previously worked on the film Let the Right One In. The production was to be filmed in English. Shooting was scheduled to begin during the summer of 2013 in Europe. Casting agent Jina Jay, previously linked to other film projects like The Adventures of Tintin, Tinker Tailor Soldier Spy and the Harry Potter films, was looking for two boys aged eight to ten, and thirteen to fifteen, who could play the two main characters Skorpan and Jonatan, respectively.

By February 2014, the film was postponed and no date has been set for when the filming was to begin. According to cinematographer Hoyte van Hoytema, the delay was caused by "the financing being so complicated because there are a lot of countries involved".

== Influences ==
Swiss writer Christian Kracht's 2025 novel Air is a reinterpretation of Lindgren's book.

A novel from British crime writer J. M. Dalgliesh, The Raven Song, part of the Hidden Norfolk/Detective Tom Janssen series, features themes and references from the book.

The Swedish progressive metal band Karmanjakah derives its name from a fictional location in the book.
