= Ran (opera) =

Swedish opera by Wilhelm Peterson-Berger

the premiere production

Ran is a 1903 Swedish-language opera in three acts by Wilhelm Peterson-Berger. Titled after the sea goddess Ran, the subject and Wagnerian influence precedes his better known opera on Nordic legend Arnljot. Successful in its day, the piano reduction of "Danslek" (playful dance) is the only excerpt remembered today.
