= Bo Andersson =

Bo Andersson may refer to:

- Bo Andersson (businessman) (born 1955), Swedish businessman
- Bo Andersson (curler) (born 1956), Swedish curler
- Bo Andersson (footballer) (born 1968), Swedish footballer
- Bo Andersson (Mjällby AIF footballer), Swedish footballer
- Bo Andersson (handballer) (born 1951), Swedish handball player
- Bo Frans Elnes Andersson (1937-2020), Finnish actor and singer

== See also ==
- Bo Anderson, American Brazilian DJ, known as Maga Bo
