= Anna-Maria Hallgarn =

Swedish musician and actress

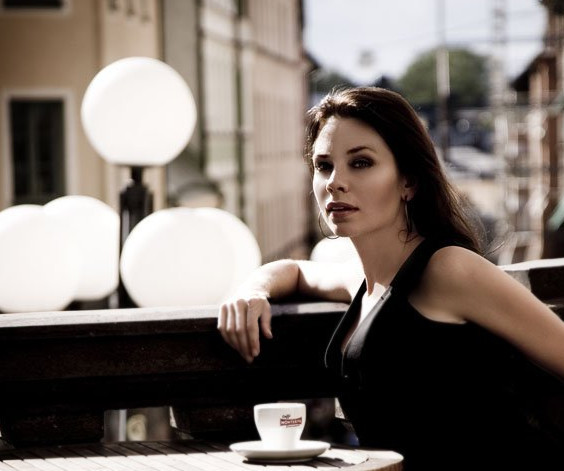

Background information
- Occupation(s): Actress, musician, singer, dancer
- Years active: 1980–present
- Website: Official website

Anna-Maria Hallgarn, (born 10 February 1971 in Orrviken, Jämtland) is a Swedish musician, singer and actress. She received acting training at Balettakademien's programme for musical artists in Gothenburg.

Her performances include Kharmen at Gothenburg City Theatre (2005). At Malmö Opera she has participated in Zorba. She has also worked on musicals including Cabaret, Jekyll & Hyde and Godspell. At GöteborgsOperan Anna-Maria Hallgarn has played the part of Vera in the newly written pop and rock musical Grymt! (Wicked) that had its premiere on Skövde scene during the spring of 2008. Anna-Maria Hallgarn played nightclub performer Adelaide in Guys and Dolls, at the Göteborg Opera, Gothenburg, Sweden (2009). She participated in Björn Skifs show.

During 2010-2012 She played Mary Magdalene in Jesus Christ Superstar at Malmö Opera and Göta Lejon.

In 2011, Hair she played the pregnant, stoned Jeannie slipping ever further into drug addiction. at the Stockholm City Theatre.

During 2012, Hallgarn played the bipolar mother Diana in Next to Normal, in the Wasa Teater, Finland.

She performed the lead role in Carmencita Rockefeller - Princess of Japan, at the Göteborg Opera in cooperation with the Malmö Opera and the Helsingborg City Theatre, which was also performed in southern and western Sweden in 2013 and 2014. Between 12 and 27 April, the play had six performances at the Scala Theatre in Stockholm. The musical is based on a true story and written by the director, playwright and actor Rikard Bergqvist. Anna-Maria Hallgarn as Carmencita Rockefeller a mysterious woman who tries to seem perfectly normal, but her twisted personality plays games with people around her.

The cast for The Last 5 Years, at Åbo Svenska Teater included Hallgarn and Alexander Lycke. The musical was written and composed by American Jason Robert Brown. Åbo Svenska Teater's version was directed by Markus Virta, and the costumes were designed by Lotta Nilsson.

Svenska Dagbladet critic Bo Löfvendahl wrote: "Anna-Maria Hallgarn makes her increasingly hollow-eyed self the most heartbreaking part of the evening with her strong, bearing voice."

Her 2002 album debut Rått & Romantiskt as a solo singer, was a set of covers. Inspired by philosophical Ulf Lundell's lyrics, Anna-Maria recorded the album in Stockholm and toured with concerts around Sweden.

In 2014 she received the Annalisa Ericson Scholarship from the Annalisa Ericson Foundation, for talent in song, dance and theater. The scholarship was awarded after a performance of Carmencita Rockefeller at the Gothenburg Opera.

2017 Anna-Maria Hallgarn together with Erik-André Hvidsten, Johan Aspelin, Saara Lehtonen, Thomas Lundin, Richard Mitts, Tove Qvickström and Maria Udd, played in Wasa Teater's Ingvar! musical. The dotted story semi-based on the biography of IKEA founder Ingvar Kamprad. Ingvar! premiered in Wasa Teater in Vaasa in September 2017, directed by Markus Virta, composed by Erik Gedeon, with lyrics by Klas Abrahamsson.

In the comedy show Grotesco, Anna-Maria acted in an episode called Föräldramötet - ett kammarspel.

== Filmography ==
- 2000 – Flykten från hönsgården
- 2000 – Grinchen - julen är stulen
- 2002 – Klassfesten
- 2017 - Grotesco
