= Bo Frans Elnes Andersson =

Bo Frans Elnes Andersson (born December 12, 1937, in Helsinki – May 7, 2020) was a Finnish actor and singer, best known to the general public for his recordings of the song "Syyslaulu" written by Erna Tauro and Tove Jansson, both in Swedish and Finnish from the late 1960s. In addition to his long theater career, he recorded around sixty other songs, mostly in Swedish.

Bo Andersson was born to a businessman in Helsinki, graduated from Brändö samskolan, and studied theater in Stockholm and jazz music in New York. He acted from the early 1960s in theaters such as Lilla Teatern, Wasa Teater, and Åbo Svenska Teater, and most notably at the Helsinki Svenska Teatern from 1967 to 1979 and 1983–2000.

== Stage Roles ==
- Horst (Bent)
- Dysart (Equus)
- Zorba (Zorba)
- Huovinen (Cell 21)
- Harpagon (The Miser)
- Herr Schulz (Cabaret)

== Album Releases ==
- 1977: Höstvisa, Love Records LRLP-246, with Erna Tauro.
- 1978: Syyslaulu, Love Records LRLP-295, with Erna Tauro.
- 1980: Tillsammans med Bo Andersson & Kalevi Rothberg, Fifty-Fifty Records FFLP-66.
- 1993: Eino Leino / Bo Andersson – Nocturne, Finnlevy 200272.
- 2003: Muistatkos? Minns Du?, with Pirjo Bergström, BOCD-3.
