= Carmencita Rockefeller - Princess of Japan =

Carmencita Rockefeller – Princess of Japan
- Music: Martin Östergren
- Lyrics: Rikard Bergqvist
- Basis: Carmencita Rockefeller - Princess of Japan played by Anna-Maria Hallgarn
- Premiere: October 2013: The Göteborg Opera
- Productions: 2013-2014 The Göteborg Opera; 2016 Scala Theatre Stockholm

Carmencita Rockefeller - Princess of Japan is a Swedish musical written and directed by Rikard Bergqvist with music by Martin Östergren, Mathias Venge and Sara Jangfeldt.

The original production opened in 2013 at The Göteborg Opera. The production team included choreographer Camilla Ekelöf, costume designer Tomas Sjöstedt, lighting designer Joakim Brink, conductor Rickard Åström. The original cast included Carmencita played by Anna-Maria Hallgarn, Åke played by Rolf Lydahl, Bing - Joachim Bergström, Texas Bill - Timo Nieminen, Baroness - Karolin Funke, Judge - Lars Hjertner.

Following a The Göteborg Opera debut in 2013, Carmencita Rockefeller - Princess of Japan was revived in the Scala Theatre Stockholm in 2016.

The musical Carmencita Rockefeller - Princess of Japan is based on real story. In the 1970s, a hairdresser from Malmö pretended to be a bright personality and professional: Carmencita Rockefeller - diplomatic, cancer researcher, member of the famous American family of financiers and granddaughter of the Japanese Emperor. Although she lacked the language skills and education, Carmencita become an established name and become the obvious choice for the Nobel Prize in medicine for others. The fraud was orchestrated with the help of her husband, who posed as her brother and said he was a CIA agent.
