= Rått & Romantiskt =

Studio album by Anna-Maria Hallgarn
- Released: December 3–4, 2002
- Studio: Demo Gramophone
- Genre: Pop; post-disco; rock; funk

Rått & Romantiskt (2002) is the debut solo album of Scandinavian artist Anna-Maria Hallgarn with drummer Ola Norrman, and keyboardist Michael Jöback.

Hallgarn is best known as a Scandinavian actress. Her 2002 album debut Rått & Romantiskt as a solo singer of covers. Inspired by philosophical Ulf Lundell's lyrics, she recorded the album in Stockholm and toured with concerts around Sweden.

The album included the five-minute acoustic song Never Lonely (Aldrig så ensam) and the ballad For those who love (För dom som älskar).

Contributors are Anna-Maria Hallgarn, Bo Hülphers, Michael Jöback and Ola Norrman. Photo made by Lasse Stener and Ulf Hallgarn. Mastering made by Henrik Jonsson. Mixer: Gunnar Norden and Ulric Johansson. Musicians: Michael Jöback - Keyboard, Ola Norwegian - Percussion, Anna-Maria Hallgarn - Vocals, Michael Jöback - Vibraphone. Recording was made by Janne Hansson. Author of lyrics is Ulf Lundell.

== Track listing ==
No.	Title	Length
1.	"Älskling"	2:40
2.	"Het vind"	5:13
3.	"Aldrig så ensam"	5:20
4.	"Domfann en gyllne rege"	1:43
5.	"Bättre tider"	3:12
6.	"Aftonfalken"	2:33
7.	"Katt i fönstret"	3:44
8.	"Rått och romantiskt"	3:47
9.	"Krig"	3:44
10.	"En historia"	1:06
11.	"För dom som älskar"	4:55
12.	"Snart kommer änglarna att landa"	3:50
13.	"Dansa nu"	2:51
14.	"Hjälp mig genom natten"	3,16
