= Isön =

Island in Östersund Municipality, Sweden

Coordinates: 63°08′12″N 14°24′42″E

Isön is a small island in lake Storsjön, Jämtland, Sweden. The island is very sparsely populated and is a part of Andersön's nature reserve. In the winter, an ice road connects Isön to the nearby larger island of Norderön. The route is also served by a ferry year round. On the other side (south east) the island is connected with a short bridge to another small island, Skansholmen, which connects further to the mainland.
