= Orrviken =

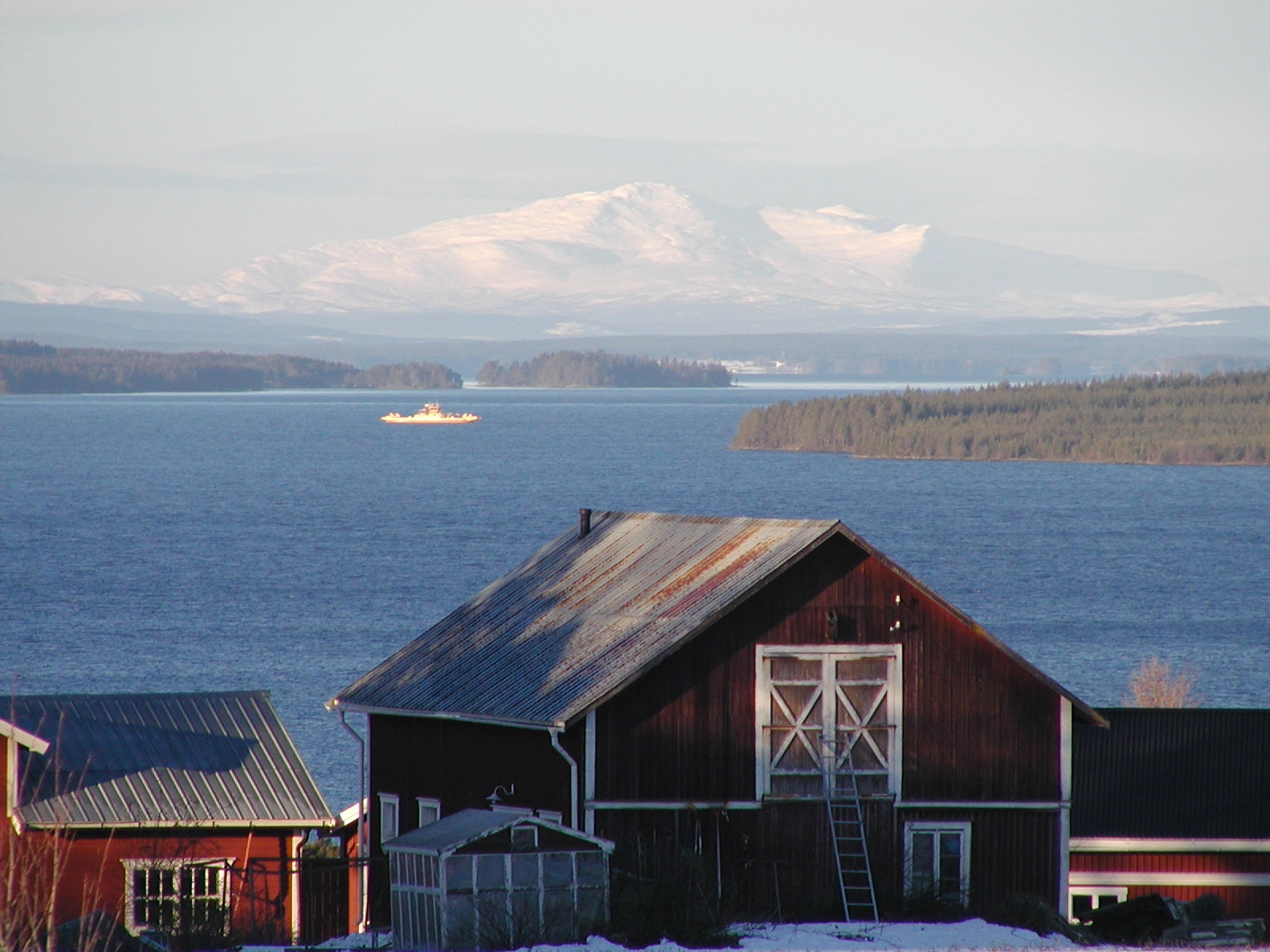
- View of Storsjön and Åreskutan from Orrviken

- Location within Jämtland Location within Sweden
- Coordinates: 63°06′N 14°26′E
- Country: Sweden
- Province: Jämtland
- County: Jämtland County
- Municipality: Östersund Municipality

Area
  - Total: 0.55 km^{2} (0.21 sq mi)

Population (31 December 2010)
  - Total: 262
  - Density: 472/km^{2} (1,220/sq mi)
- Time zone: UTC+1 (CET)
  - Summer (DST): UTC+2 (CEST)

Orrviken is a locality situated in Östersund Municipality, Jämtland County, Sweden with 262 inhabitants in 2010.

Actress Anna-Maria Hallgarn comes from Orrviken.
