= Katla (dragon) =

Fictional dragon in The Brothers Lionheart by Astrid Lindgren

Katla is a fictional dragon from the Swedish children's book The Brothers Lionheart, written by Astrid Lindgren. The name Katla is an old Norse female name and means either "the kettle" or "the boiler". It is also the name of a volcano in Iceland and a Heavy Metal band from Denmark.

Katla is a huge ancient monster in the land of Nangijala, with the ability to spray flames from her mouth, just like its namesake volcano in Iceland. If a victim of the flames survives, the victim is paralyzed. Katla is controlled and will obey only a lur, which is owned by the evil warlord Tengil, who uses Katla to terrorize Nangijala. The scale of Katla is so strong that no weapon can injure her or even leave a scratch. When the citizens of Thorn Rose Valley rise up against Tengil, he uses Katla to stop them, but loses the lur to Jonathan Lionheart, one of the protagonists. Jonathan uses the lur to make Katla kill Tengil, but Katla later burns Jonathan, wounding him. Before succumbing to the paralysis, Jonathan manages to push a large boulder onto Katla, making her fall into a river. In the river, she battles another great beast, Karm the lindworm, and the two monsters kill each other.

In the 1977 film adaptation of the novel, Katla was played by a model, four meters tall and eight meters long, created by Pinewood Studios. The model contained three people; one in each front leg, and one at a small control panel. Costing 100,000 SEK to produce, it could blink, spit fire, and whip its tail. The model has not been used since, and is currently located in Trollywood.

Katla is not killed by Karm in the film. Instead, she drowns in the boiling pool of mud after being hit by the boulder.
