= Frösö Runestone =

Coordinates: 63°11′00″N 14°37′08″E

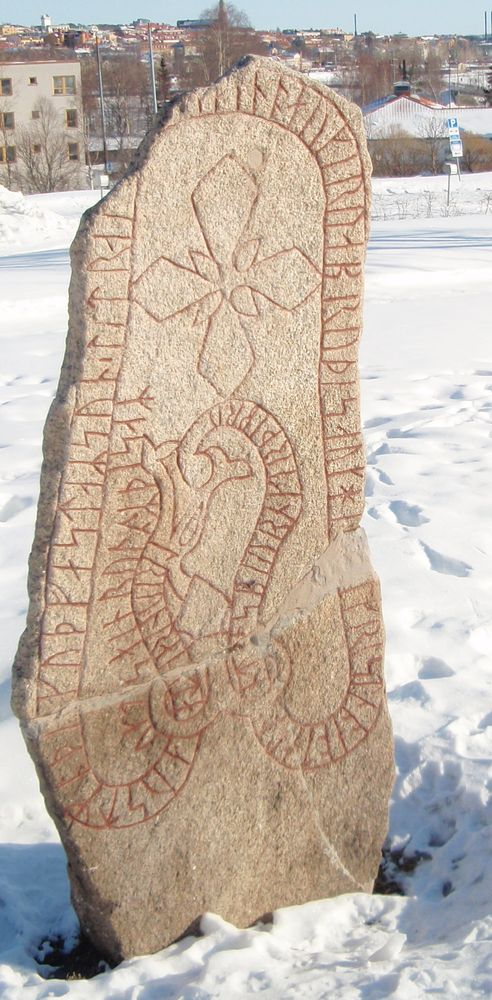
- Created: 1030-1050
- Discovered: Östersund, Jämtland, Sweden
- Rundata ID: J RS1928;66 $
- Runemaster: Trjónn and Steinn

Text – Native
- austmoþr kuþfastaʀ sun lit rai...rais... .....-n þino auk kirua bru þisa auk hon lit kristno eotalont .. osbiurn kirþi bru triun raist auk tsain runoʀ þisaʀ: Normalized: Austmaðr, Guðfastar sun, lét raisa stainn þenna, auk gerva brú þessa, auk hann lét kristna Jamtaland. Ásbjörn gerði brú. Trjónn raist, auk Stainn, rúnar þessar.

Translation
- Austmaðr, Guðfastr's son, had this stone raised and this bridge built and Christianized Jamtaland. Ásbjörn built the bridge. Trjónn and Steinn carved these runes.

A reading of the Frösö Runestone's text in Old East Norse.

Frösöstenen (J RS1928;$66 ) is the northernmost raised runestone in Sweden (Note: The northernmost in the world is the Kingittorsuaq Runestone, in Greenland) and Jämtland's only runestone. It originally stood at the tip of ferry terminal on the sound between the island of Frösön and Östersund.

On it is inscribed:

Austmaðr, Guðfastr's son, had this stone raised and this bridge built and Christianized Jämtland. Ásbjörn built the bridge. Trjónn and Steinn carved these runes.

The following Old Norse person and place names appear in the inscription:

- Austmaðr (English: Man from the East) - An Old West Norse speaking man from Mainland Scandinavia. Similarly, Vestmaðr (English: Man from the West) was an Old West Norse-speaking Briton.
- Guðfastr (English: He who is faithful to God)
- Jamtaland (English: Land of the "Jamtar"- The Old Norse name for Jämtland where jamti may mean 'hard-working person'; cf. German adjective emsig 'hard-working'.)
- Ásbjörn (English: God Bear)
- Trjónn - (English: Snout - A name more or less specific to Jämtland, and also found in several Medieval documents from Jämtland)
- Steinn (English: Stone)

The stone is also unique in that it was done in memory of Austmaðr's Christianisation of Jämtland, rather than as a cenotaph. The stone dates to between 1030 and 1050. It has now been relocated to the lawn in front of the local county seat due to the construction of a new bridge, from 1969 to 1971, on the original site.

== See also ==
- Arnljot
- Christianization of Scandinavia
- Joint Nordic database for runic inscriptions
- List of runestones
- Runestone
- Runic alphabet
