= Wilhelm Peterson-Berger =

Swedish composer and music critic (1867–1942)

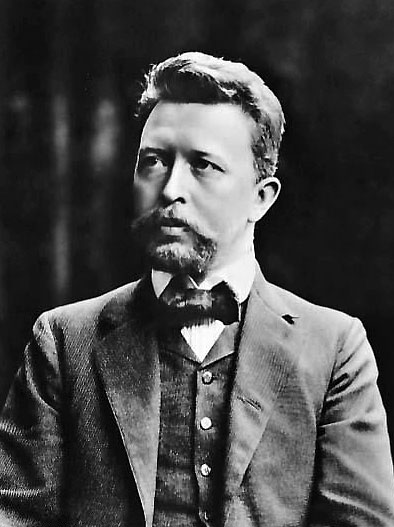
- Peterson-Berger c. 1900
- Born: 27 February 1867; Ullånger
- Died: 3 December 1942 (aged 75); Östersund
- Burial place: Frösön church
- Other names: P-B, Pelle Bemme
- Occupation: Composer
- Years active: 1883–1942
- Style: Romantic nationalism

Olof Wilhelm Peterson-Berger ( 27 February 1867 – 3 December 1942) was a Swedish composer and music critic. As a composer, his main musical influences were Grieg, August Söderman and Wagner as well as Swedish folk idiom.

== The composer ==
Peterson-Berger was born in Ullånger. He studied at the Stockholm Conservatory from 1886 to 1889 and then in Dresden for a year.

He is best known for three albums of national romantic piano pieces entitled Frösöblomster I, II and III (Flowers of Frösö), which include the often performed Vid Frösö kyrka (At Frösö Church) and Sommarsång (Summer Song). The sets, which were composed over a period of 18 years (1896–1914) and brought together afterwards as a collection have gained a reputation of representing a quintessential "Swedishness" in the romantic, nationalistic vein of their time. The most famous of the pieces, Sommarsång (Summer Song) recalls the warm, calm, harmonious and bright pre-summer evenings where the sun in the north almost never goes down; they were the great breakthrough for Wilhelm. Sommarsång is still known to most Swedes, even to people generally uninterested in music: the majority of young piano students in the Nordic countries have been taught this piece. His songs for vocal ensemble are also still regularly performed, and are part of the core repertoire of Swedish choirs.

His other works include the five symphonies – among them are no.2 Sunnanfärd and no.3 Same-Ätnam generally considered the best – as well as the operas Ran, Arnljot, Domedagsprofeterna ("The Doomsday Prophets") and Adils och Elisiv ("Adils and Elisiv"). His command of the larger forms, in both architecture and instrumentation, is disputed.

He was stage manager at the Stockholm Opera from 1908 to 1910. The opera Arnljot has nevertheless become something of a symbol for the province of Jämtland and is regularly performed there, as a "musical drama", at Arnljotlägden on Frösön, close to Peterson-Berger's former home, Sommarhagen. Domedagsprofeterna is the antithesis of Arnljot – a light festive musical comedy set in 17th-century Uppsala, while the saga Adils och Elisiv where Swedish ‘talsång’ (speechsong) attained its purest expression is a work extolling Peterson-Berger's belief in humanism and the goodness of man.

He also wrote about eighty songs, many of which set poems by Erik Axel Karlfeldt, for example Aspåkerspolska.

He died in Östersund.

== Work list (partial) ==
=== Orchestral ===
- Symphony No.1 in B♭ major, Baneret ("The Banner"), 1889–1903, revised 1932–1933 Movements: "När vi först drogo ut", "Mellan fedjerna", "Vid hjältebåren", "Mot nya vårar"
- Symphony No.2 in E♭ major, Sunnanfärd ("The Journey of Southerly Winds"), 1910 Movements: "Stiltje – Seglats", "Rosenstaden: Dionysoståget – I Eros tempel – Symposion", "Hemlängtan – För sunnanvind"
- Symphony No.3 in F minor, Same Ätnam ("Lappland Symphony"), 1913–1915 Movements: "Forntidsbilder", "Vinterkväll", "Sommarnatt", "Framtidsdrömmar"
- Symphony No.4 in A major, Holmia ("Stockholm"), 1929
- Symphony No.5 in B minor, Solitudo ("Solitude"), 1932–1933
- Orientalisk Dans ("Oriental Dance"), 1889–1890
- Violin concerto in F♯ minor, 1915–1928
- Romance in D minor for violin and orchestra, 1915
- Törnrosasagan ("The Story of the Sleeping Beauty"), 1934
- Symphony No.6, Hellas ("Greece"), 1935–1938 – unfinished

=== Opera ===
- Ran, 1899–1900
- Lyckan ('The Happiness'), 1903
- Arnljot, 1907–1909
- Domedagsprofeterna ('The Doomsday Prophets'), 1912–1917
- Adils and Elisiv, 1921–1924

=== Vocal ===
- Sveagaldrar, cantata, 1897
- Part songs/music for choir: Tio sånger för blandad kör; Album, 8 sånger för blandad kör (including his settings of J. P. Jacobsen’s ‘Stemning’ and Helena Nyblom′s 'I Fyrreskoven'); Juninatt (words by M J Lermontov translated by W P-B; Guldfågel; Trädet, Ingerid Sletten, Prinsessen (words Bjornstjerne Bjornson); Våren kom en Valborgsnatt; Hvile i Skoven – Chorus mysticus (words J S C Welhaven); Sommarkväll.
- Solo songs: Jamtlandsminnen (Memories from Jamtland) opus 4 (1893), Fyra visor i svensk folkton (Op. 5) including 'När jag för mig själv i mörka skogen går' and 'Bland skogens höga furustammar', Ur Fridolins visor (From the melodies of Fridolin) with words by E A Karlfeldt (1900), Ur Hösthorn (1928), Återkomst (Return)

=== Piano music ===
- Frösöblomster ("Fröso Flowers"), 1896, 8 pieces including Sommarsång, Lawn tennis, Till rosorna, Gratulation and Vid Frösö kyrka
- Frösöblomster II, 1900, 6 pieces
- Frösöblomster III: I sommarhagen, 1914, including Intåg i Sommarhagen
- Six songs for piano, 1897
- Färdminnen, 1908
- Earina, 1917, 7 pieces
- Italiana, 1922
- Anakreontika, two books, 1924 and 1936

== Critic and writer ==
As well as being a composer, Peterson-Berger was also a respected though very controversial music critic for the Stockholm newspaper Dagens Nyheter ("News of the Day") from 1896 to 1930. He was conservative and fought the increasing influence of modernism in music, especially from Arnold Schoenberg and his followers. His progress was hindered by many enemies whom he made through his writings; he attacked showy virtuosity and dry academicism with satire but also with strict conscientiousness. For either composers or performers who did not conform to his taste (or who were young and insecure female musicians, to take one typical example), he was not above grave personal insults.
Other writings include ‘Svensk musikkultur’ (Swedish musical culture, 1911) which includes clearsighted and satirical attacks on the prevailing musical establishment, ‘Richard Wagner som kulturföreteelse’ (Richard Wagner as a cultural phenomenon, 1913) as well as translations of Tristan und Isolde (for a 1909 production in Stockholm), and Friedrich Nietzsche’s The Birth of Tragedy (1902) and Thus Spoke Zarathustra (1919).

== The man ==
One acquaintance later recalled his surprise when, on a journey by train from Stockholm to Östersund and Frösön, the big man and notorious critic suddenly burst into tears and felt soft like a child as the bucolic landscape of his beloved Jämtland began to unfold outside the window. Even this writer, however, noted that even Peterson-Berger's threatening and miserable physical appearance and demeanour conformed to the stereotype of the dour Scandinavian.

His home on the island of Frösön near Östersund (where he spent his summers from 1914 and then lived permanently from 1930) is open to the public in the summer months and is much as the composer left it. The downstairs music hall has his grand piano (he was a competent pianist), a work room (with a ‘picture window’ looking out over Storsjön) and library (with his collection of books and scores), while upstairs the bedrooms may be viewed. He lived alone there with a butler and his cats. There is also a small café where books and CDs are sold.
