= Kettil Runske =

Legendary figure credited with bringing runes to mankind

Kettil Runske was, according to Olaus Magnus' Historia de Gentibus Septentrionalibus (1555), the man who brought runes to humankind, by stealing three rune staffs from Odin from which he learnt the runes. An apprentice named Gilbert defied Kettil, who punished him by throwing a rune staff at him whereby he was imprisoned. Gilbert was for a long time imprisoned in a cave on Visingsö in Lake Vättern.

== Sources ==
- Olaus Magnus. 1555. Historia de Gentibus Septentrionalibus
- Ebbe Schön. 2004. Asa-Tors hammare. Fält & Hässler, Värnamo, ISBN 91-89660-41-2.
