= Wasa Theatre =

Swedish-language theatre in Vaasa, Finland

Wasa Theater Österbotten regional theater
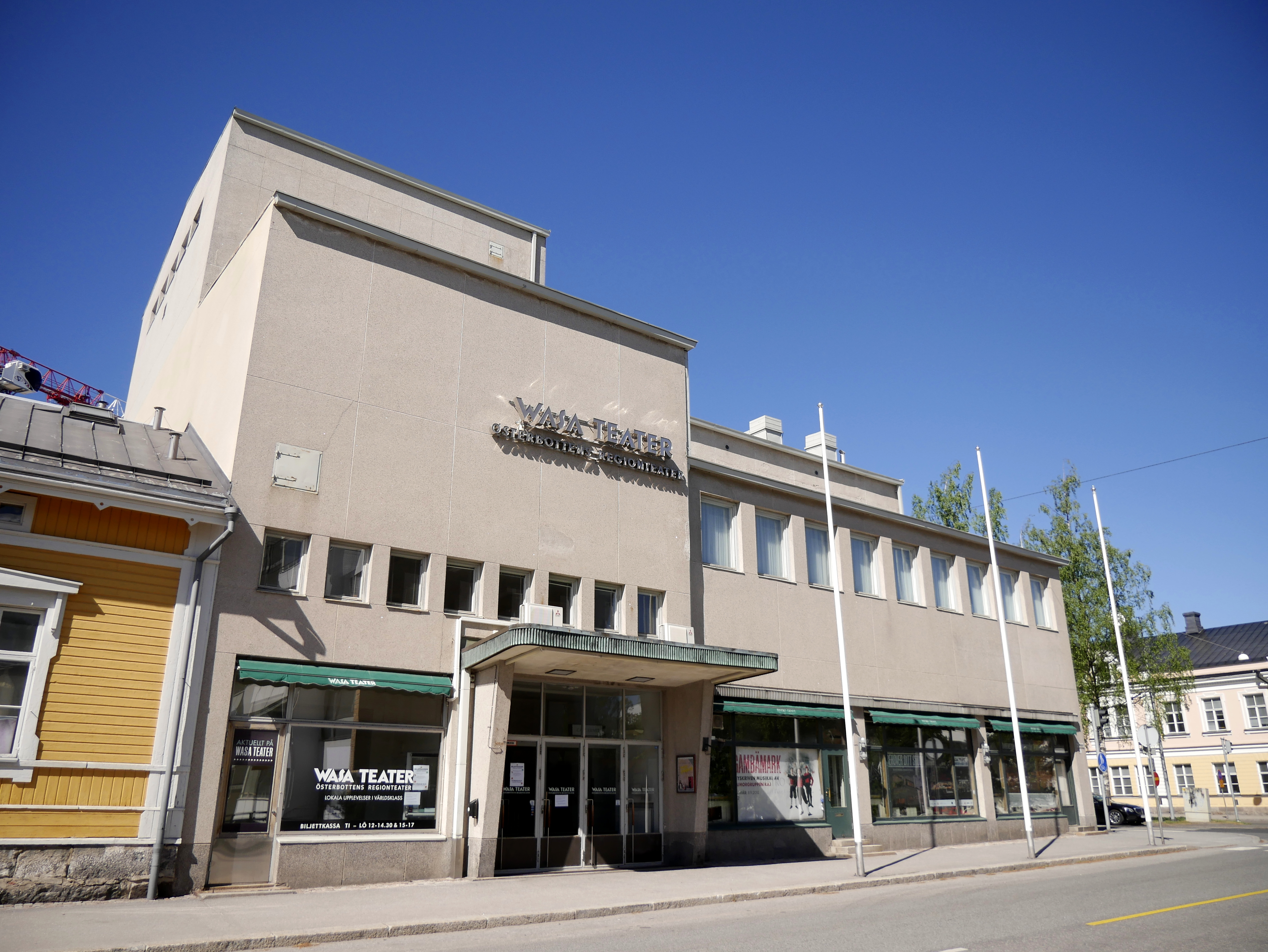
- Theater exterior in 2018
- Interactive map of the Wasa Theater Österbotten regional theater area

General information
- Location: Sandögatan 7 Vaasa, FIN, Finland
- Coordinates: 63.096877°N 21.607095°E
- Construction started: 1868^{1}
- Renovated: 1997-98

Website
- https://www.wasateater.fi/om-oss/in-english/

Wasa theatre (Wasa Teater) is a professional Swedish-language theatre in the Finnish city of Vaasa. It is the regional theatre of Österbotten and was founded in 1919.

== History ==
The current theatre building was completed in 1955 and was designed by architects Bertel Liljequist and Sam Salvesen. The old building, which was completely destroyed in 1953, was built in 1868 after drawings by Carl Axel Setterberg. The theatre was renovated in 1997-1998. Its large stage has seats for 272 people, studio for 80-120 people and Vasallen scene for 62 people. It has approximately 45,000 visitors and 6-7 premiers per year.

Wasa theatre tries to have a versatile repertoire as possible to suit all ages, including classical and contemporary drama, musicals, family poems, children's and youth play. In addition to performances, the theatre has extensive tour activities in the Swedish language. With the local schools, writers' societies and volunteers co-operation, Wasa theatre plays an important cultural role in Finland.

Linda Zilliacus took over from Ann-Luise Bertell as leader of the theatre in 2025.

== Events ==
The musical Next to Normal went on stage in 2012 directed by Victoria Brattström with the cast of Johan Aspelin, Samuel Harjanne, Markus Lytts, Mikaela Tidermark, Sören Lillkung and Anna-Maria Hallgarn as the main characters. The show is about a family that looks set to be normal and happy, but in reality, it is struggling with big problems. The musical had a premiere in New York in 2008, became very popular, and has been shown around the world. This was the second time it was performed in Swedish; it had already been shown in Finnish in Helsinki.

Ingvar! premiered in September 2017, directed by Markus Virta, composed by Erik Gedeon, with lyrics by Klas Abrahamsson. The main characters were played by Anna-Maria Hallgarn, Erik-André Hvidsten, Johan Aspelin, Saara Lehtonen, Thomas Lundin, Richard Mitts, Tove Qvickström and Maria Udd. The musical was loosely based on the biography of IKEA founder Ingvar Kamprad.
