= Storsjön =

Lake in northern Sweden

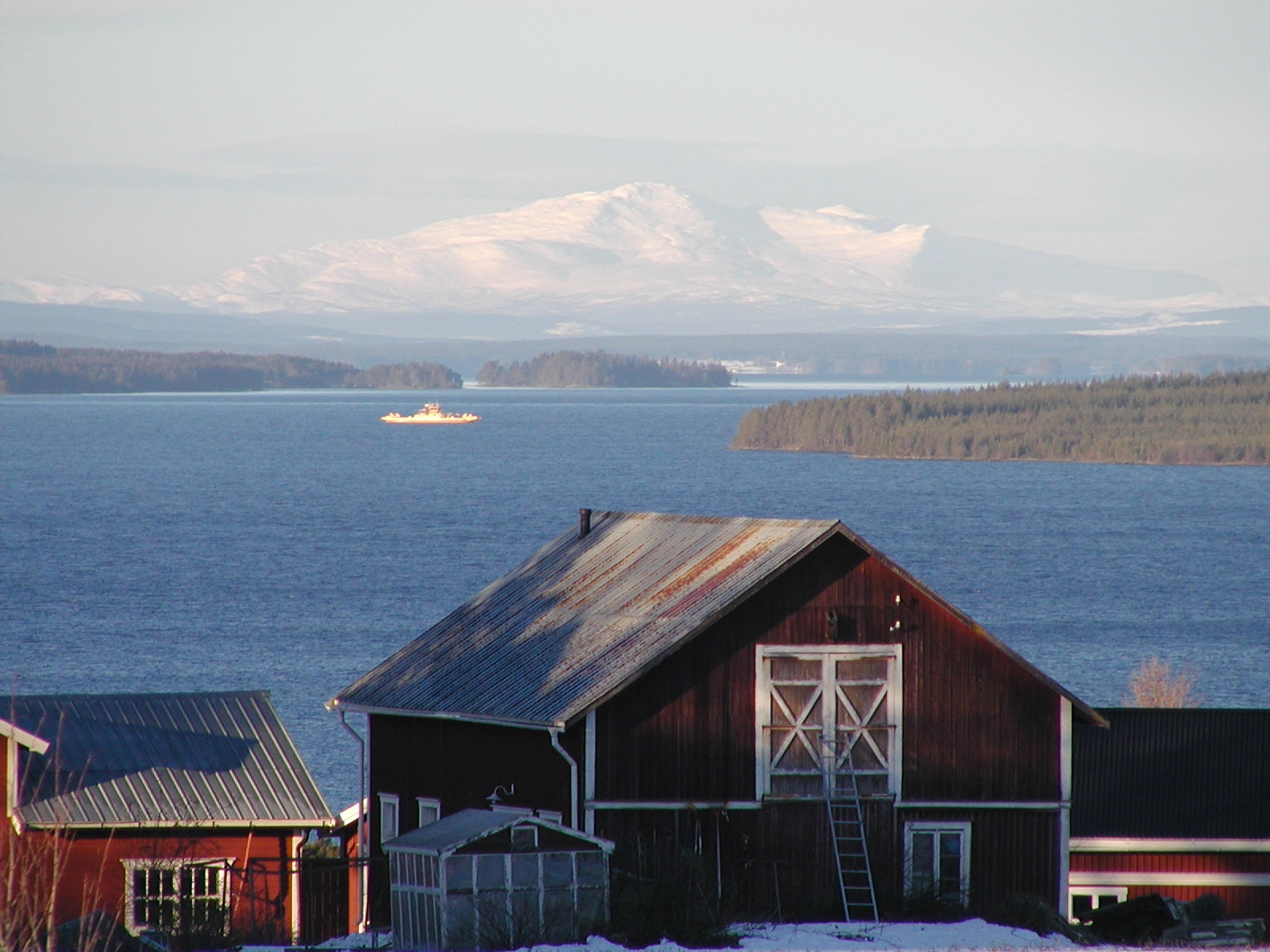
- Storsjön and Oviksfjällen seen from Orrviken, November 2006

- Location within Jämtland Location within Sweden
- Location: Jämtland
- Coordinates: 63°13′N 14°19′E
- Catchment area: 12,064 km^{2} (4,658 sq mi)
- Basin countries: Sweden
- Surface area: 464 km^{2} (179 sq mi)
- Average depth: 17.3 m (57 ft)
- Max. depth: 74 m (243 ft)
- Water volume: 8.018 km^{3} (6,500,000 acre⋅ft)
- Shore length^{1}: 439 km (273 mi)
- Surface elevation: 292 m (958 ft)
- Islands: Frösön
- Settlements: Krokom, Brunflo, Orrviken
- ^{1} Shore length is not a well-defined measure.

Storsjön (Swedish pronunciation: [ˈstûːrɧøːn], lit. 'The Great Lake') is the fifth largest lake in Sweden, with an area of 464 km^{2} (179 sq mi) and a greatest depth of 74 m (243 ft). It is the largest lake in central Sweden, located in the province of Jämtland in modern Jämtland County. From Storsjön runs the river Indalsälven and the lake contains the major island Frösön. The city of Östersund is located on the east shore of the lake, opposite Frösön.

Storsjön is said to be the home of Storsjöodjuret, a cryptid lake monster not unlike the Loch Ness Monster, and every now and then there are new reports of people having spotted it. Descriptions of the creature have varied over the years. Some have described it as being serpentine in appearance, with multiple humps, a feline or canine-like head and grayish skin. Others have claimed that the creature is short in stature and morbidly obese, with a roundish skull.

The ferry company Vägverket Färjerederiet (run by the Swedish Road Authority) provides two ferry lines crossing the lake, one from Norderön to Håkansta and one from Isön to Norderön. They are replaced by ice roads during the winter, usually January–April.

== See also ==
- Storsjöodjuret
- Lakes of Sweden
