= Frösön =

Island in Storsjön in Östersund Municipality, Sweden

Coordinates: 63°11′30″N 14°32′30″E

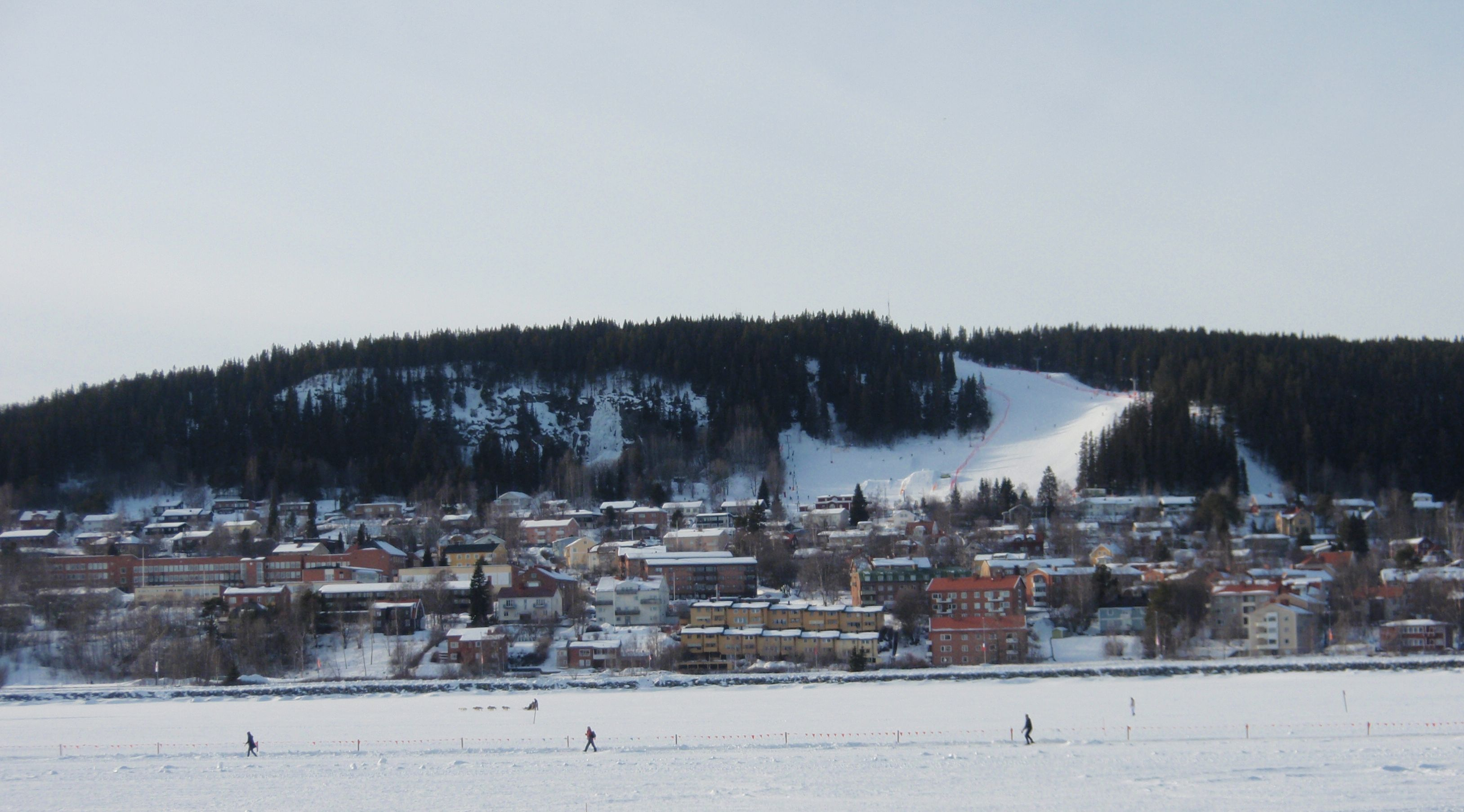
Frösön in 2008.

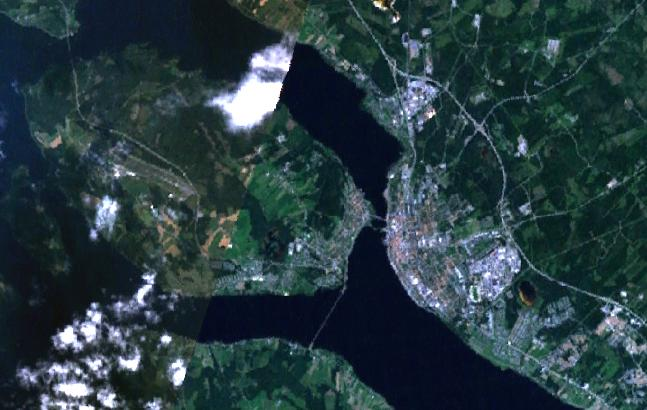
Satellite image of the Island Frösön and the city of Östersund.

Frösön (Swedish: [ˈfrø̂ːsˌøːn], Jämtlandic: [ˈfɾø̂ːsˌœʏːa]; "Frey's island") is the largest island in the lake Storsjön, Jämtland, Sweden. Part of the city Östersund is located on the island. During most of recorded history Frösön was the regional centre of Jämtland, and it is the location of the Frösö Runestone, the northernmost runestone in the world.

The Swedish composer Wilhelm Peterson-Berger had a summer house (and from 1930 a permanent home) on the island. In 1896 Peterson-Berger composed a set of piano pieces entitled Frösöblomster (Flowers of Frösön), and his opera Arnljot from 1910 is partly based on the runic inscriptions on Frösö Runestone.

== History ==
Frösön is named after the Norse god Freyr. It is the location of the "Frösö Runestone", the northernmost raised runestone in the world, dating from 1030 to 1050 AD. Frösön was a separate köping until 1974 but was merged with Östersund at that time.

=== Hospital ===
From 1915 to 1988, Frösön was the location of Frösö sjukhus, a state-owned psychiatric hospital tasked with caring for patients from all of Norrland. The hospital's practices have later been questioned, and it is known to have anonymously buried about 50 of its patients.

== Climate ==
Climate data for Frösön
Month	Jan	Feb	Mar	Apr	May	Jun	Jul	Aug	Sep	Oct	Nov	Dec	Year
Mean daily maximum °C (°F)	−5 (23)	−3 (26)	0 (33)	5 (42)	12 (53)	16 (61)	18 (65)	17 (62)	12 (53)	6 (42)	0 (32)	−3 (26)	6 (43)
Mean daily minimum °C (°F)	−10 (15)	−9 (16)	−6 (21)	−2 (29)	3 (38)	8 (46)	10 (51)	10 (49)	6 (42)	2 (35)	−3 (26)	−8 (18)	0 (32)
Average precipitation mm (inches)	19.0 (0.75)	16.3 (0.64)	14.0 (0.55)	19.8 (0.78)	22.5 (0.89)	47.0 (1.85)	60.9 (2.40)	48.3 (1.90)	33.6 (1.32)	24.6 (0.97)	19.3 (0.76)	18.0 (0.71)	343.3 (13.52)
Source: SMHI

== Gallery ==
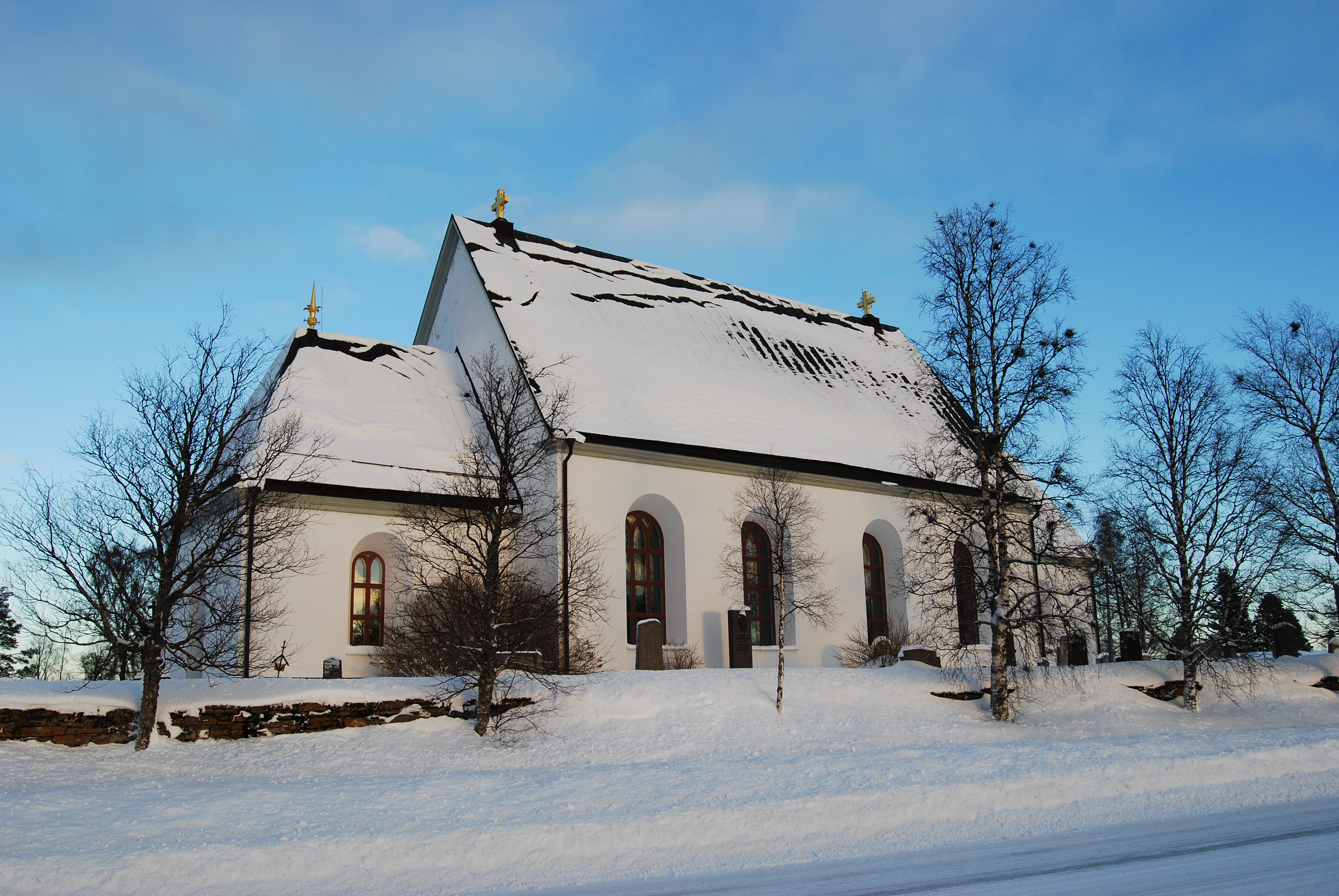
Frösö church

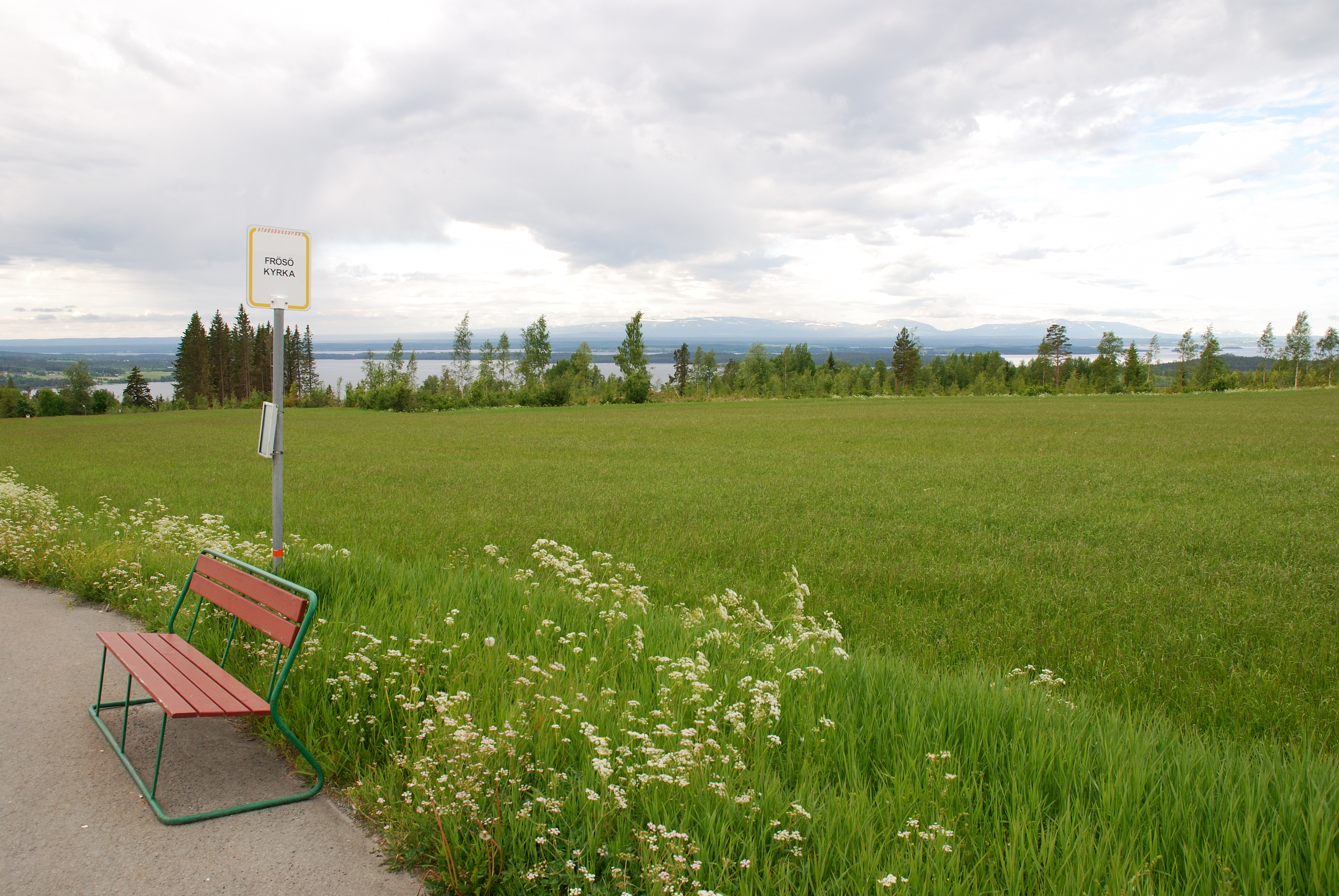
Frösö church bus stop

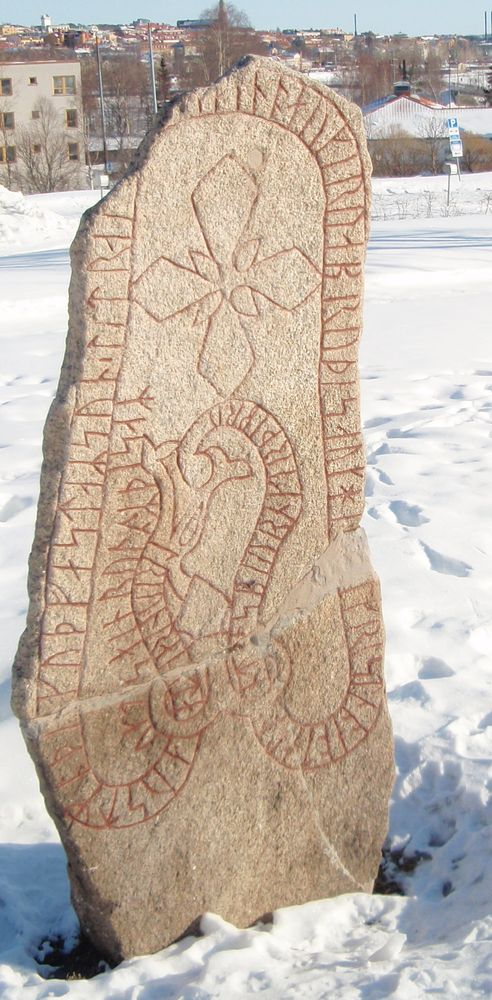
Frösö Runestone

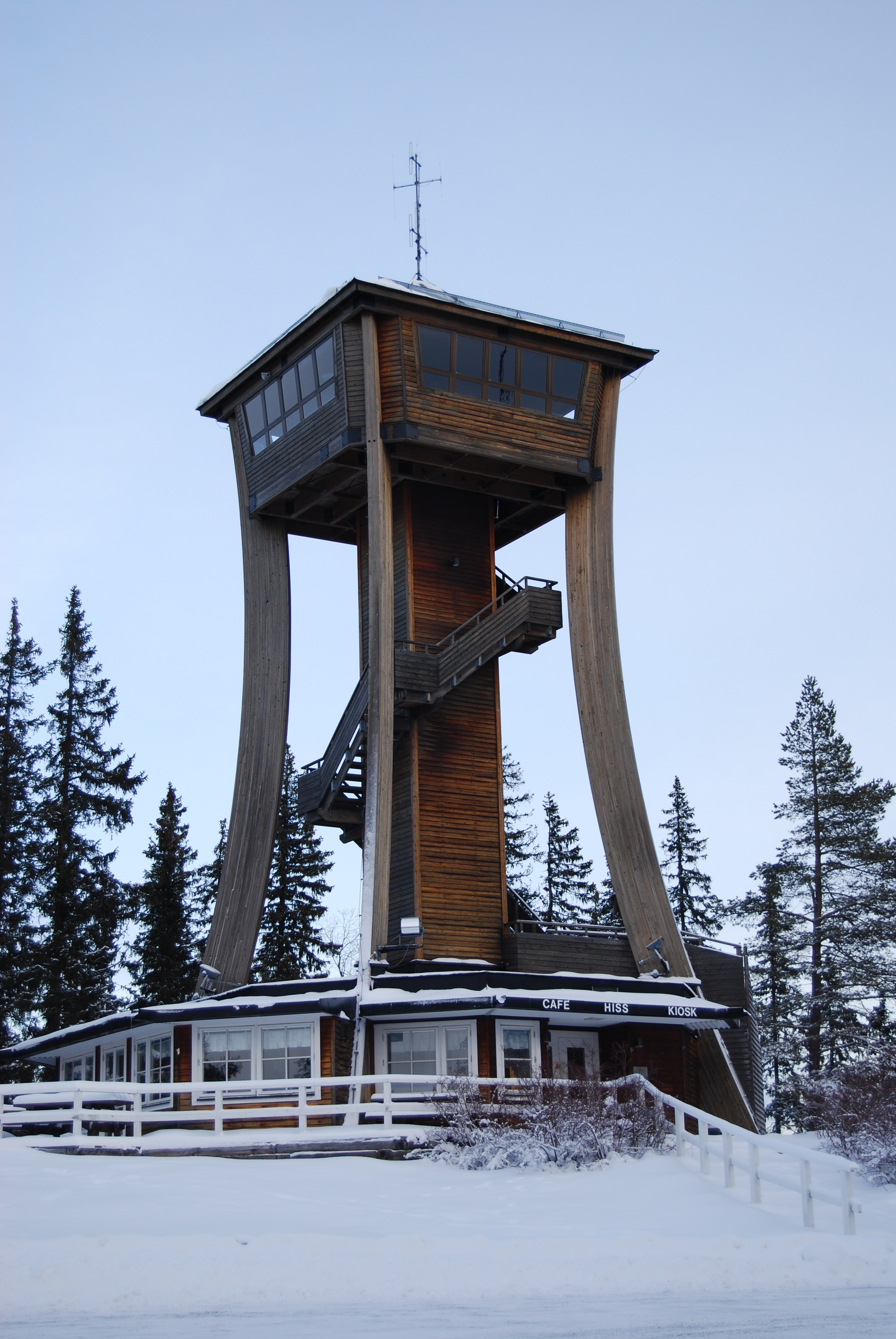
Frösö tower

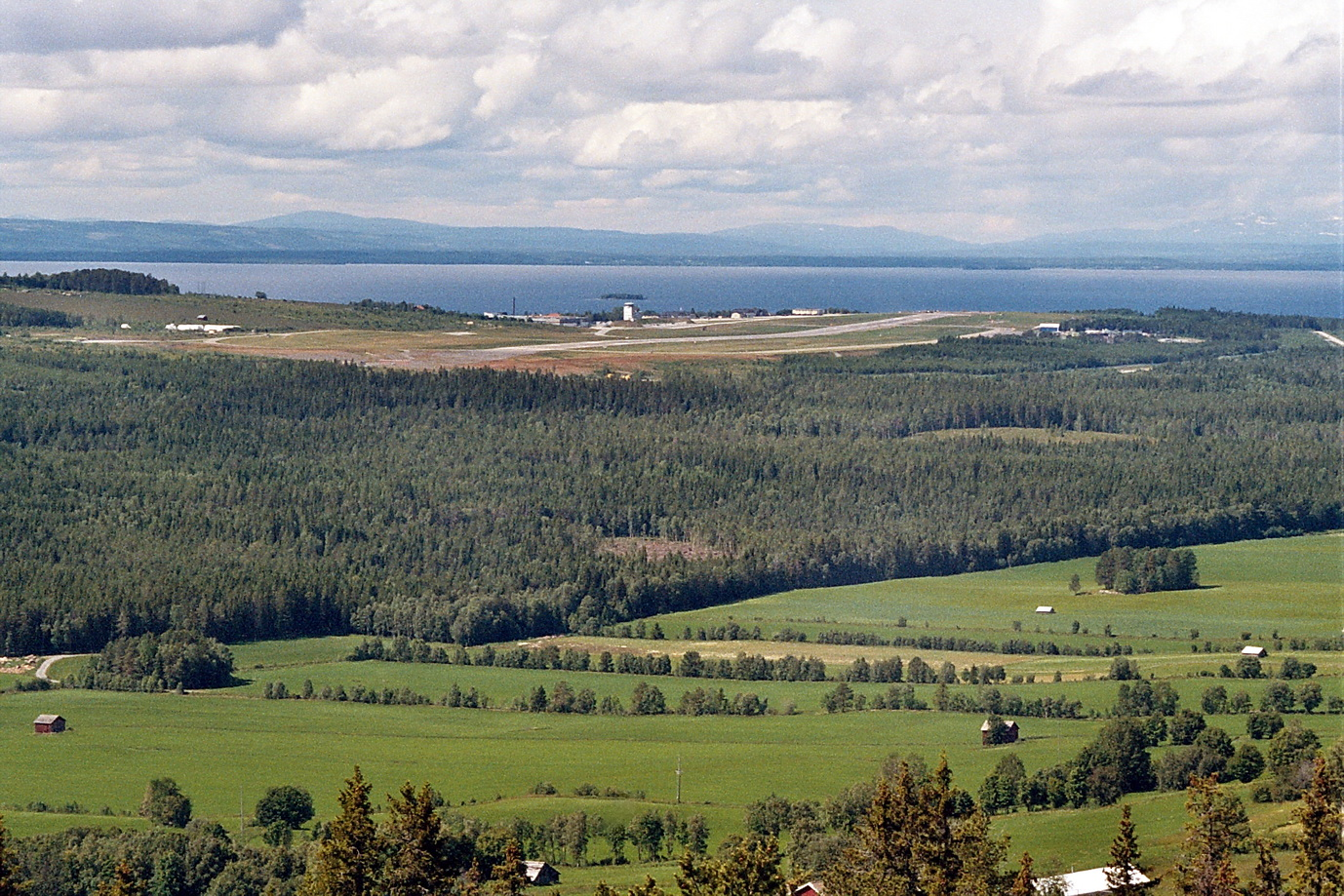
Airport
