= Arnljot =

Opera by Wilhelm Peterson-Berger

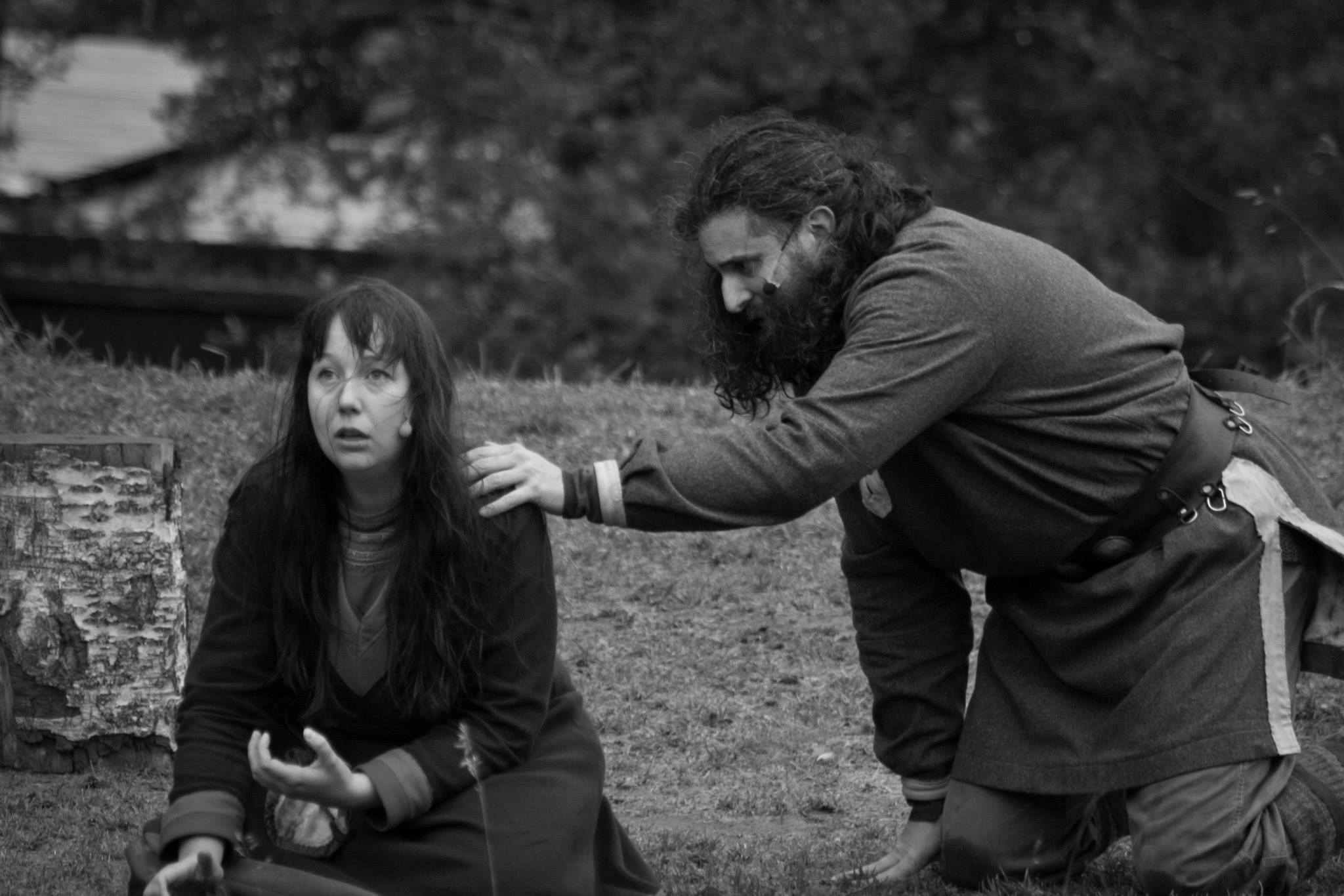
Vaino (Mikaela Pålsson) and Arnljot (Emil Grudemo El Hayek) at Arnljotspelen 2015

Arnljot is an opera by the Swedish composer Wilhelm Peterson-Berger. Written in 1906, it premiered April 13, 1910, and was revised in 1956.

The origin to Arnljot is a melody that Wilhelm Peterson-Berger created when he first visited Jämtland in 1898. When he journeyed over Storsjön he was inspired by the nearby mountains, Oviksfjällen. The opera consists of three parts and the historical foundation of the opera is the character Arnljot Gelline that is mentioned in Snorri Sturluson saga about Olav Haraldsson (den Helige, Rex perpetuus Norvegiae) and the writings on Frösöstenen, the rune stone that is placed on Frösön. Out of these components, Wilhelm Peterson-Berger wrote his drama.

== Performance history ==
Frithiof Strömberg in the title role, 1910 premiere

Julia Claussen as Gunhild, 1910 premiere

The original performance of Arnljot as an opera was put on on April 13, 1910, at the Royal Opera in Stockholm. However, Wilhelm Peterson-Berger had already two years earlier allowed amateurs to perform parts of the texts and music on Frösön on a midsummer night eve. Nearly 3.000 persons witnessed this amateur performance of the Arnljot play. Today, each summer the Arnljot play (the opera is performed as a play, but the texts and music remains the same) staged in an outdoor environment on the island of Frösön, close to where the actual premiere took place in 1908. The background of the stage is a panoramic view over Storsjön and Oviksfjällen; thus, when the audience hears the introduction tune of the opera, they see the same view as Wilhelm Peterson-Berger did when he created the opera. 2012 is the 73rd summer with Arnljot on Frösön since 1935.

== Famous passage from the drama ==
The quote below serves as an inspiration for the present-day independence movement (an established cultural institution) that exists in the Swedish province of Jamtland.

"Listen Jamtar ('Jämts') to what I have to say for a while. Not even eighty winters have passed since Jamtland was still free and in charge of its own business. Back then, no taxes was given away to foreign kings. Why we settled being enslaved, at first under Norway and then under Svitiod [a reference to Sweden], are something that I have never understood. This country, being protected by forests, bogs and mountains, is difficult to raid and easy to defend. There are plenty of fighting men among us and more such men can be brought here if paid by goods. Therefore, I now advise you - end this dispute of which kingdom we belong. Let us refuse all foreign attempts to make us a county, no matter who demands this from us. Let us again seize our former freedom and elect a chief for all of our country, a king who will lead our struggle if the struggle is needed to defend our homes and our land."

/ Sigurd in Slandrom, one of the chieftains in Jämtland supporting Arnljot as king, at the "thing" on Frösön, act I, June 1025.

== Recordings ==
- Arnljot (excerpts) Erland Hagegard, Karin Langebo, Edith Thallaug, Bjorn Asker, Kage Jehrlander, Male Chorus from the Stockholm Philharmonic Choir, Stockholm Philharmonic Orchestra conducted Okko Kamu. Sterling 1CD
