= Spira Cultural Center =

Culture center in Jönköping, Sweden

Coordinates: 57.7775°N 14.1717°E

- Kulturhuset Spira
- Interactive map of Spira Cultural Center

Construction
- Opened: 11 November 2011

The Spira Cultural Center (Swedish: Kulturhuset Spira) is a cultural center in Jönköping, Sweden. It was opened on 11 November 2011.
