= Gothenburg opera house =

Opera house in Gothenburg, Sweden

Coordinates: 57°42′40″N 11°57′51″E

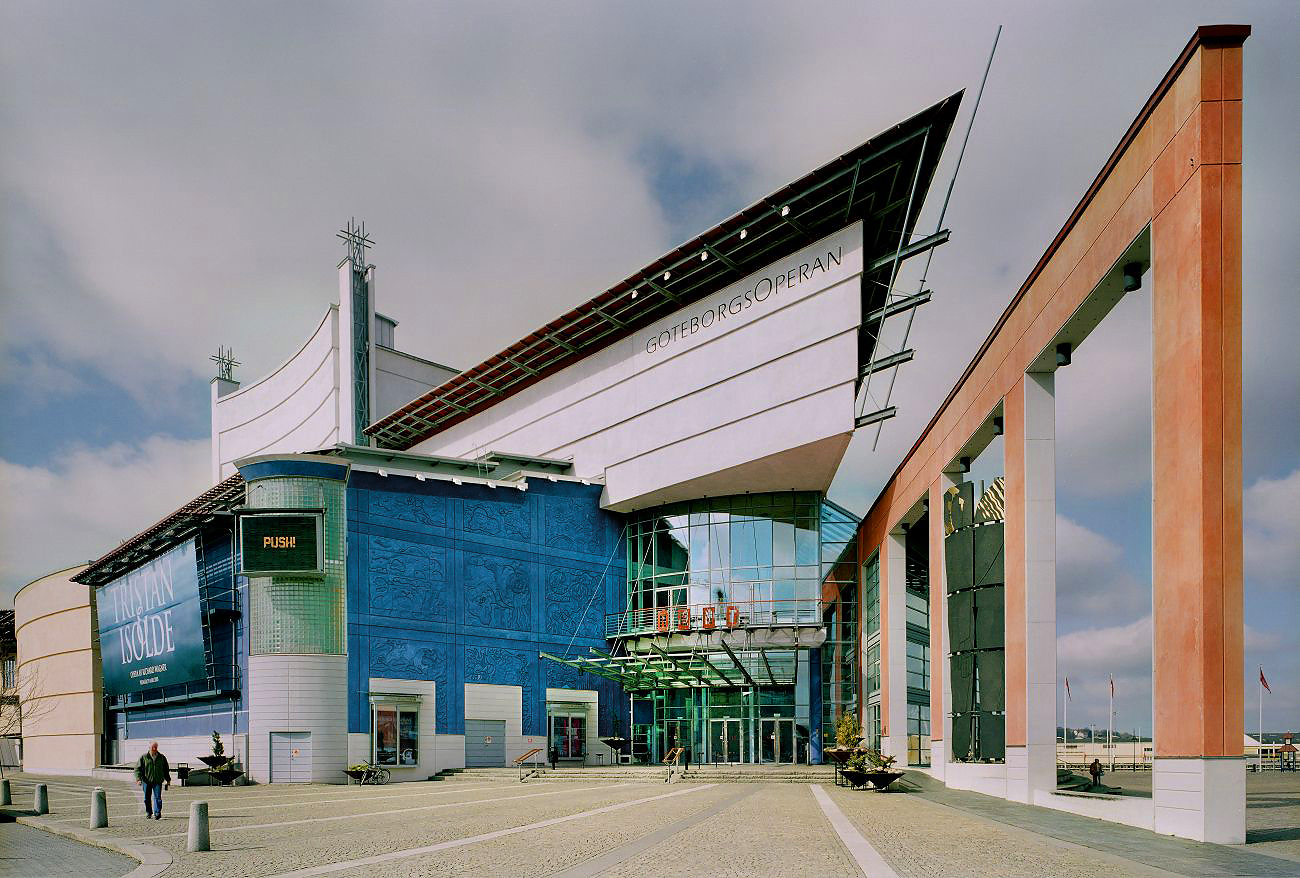
- Interactive map of the Gothenburg opera house area

General information
- Type: Arts complex
- Architectural style: Post-modernist
- Location: Christina Nilssons gata, Gothenburg, Sweden
- Completed: 1994
- Opened: 1 October 1994

Design and construction
- Architects: Jan Izikowitz of Lund & Valentin

The Gothenburg opera house (Swedish: Göteborgsoperan) is an opera house at Lilla Bommen in Gothenburg, Sweden. The Artistic Director for opera is Henning Ruhe since 2019, while Katrín Hall leads the Gothenburg Opera Dance Company.

== History ==
The Gothenburg opera house is relatively new: construction started in September 1989 after significant local commitment in the late 1980s (with as many as 6,000 contributors to the new house) and it was completed with great speed. Ground breaking took place in June 1991, and the building was inaugurated in October 1994.

It hosted Melodifestivalen 2000, the Swedish national selection for the Eurovision Song Contest.

== Building and capacity ==
The result was an auditorium built in the classical style. With its stalls and balconies, it has 1,276 seats. The orchestra pit has room for about 100 musicians. The House is shared by opera, ballet, musicals and operettas so the architects had to meet a number of challenges.

It is a large house – 160 metres long and 85 metres wide at its widest – and the building is 32 metres high. The floor area is 28,700 square metres. The main stage is 500 square metres, while the stage opening is 20 metres (66 ft) high and 9 metres (30 ft) wide. There are four movable platforms that each can carry a weight of 15 tons. The stage can be lit by 1000 spotlights with 250 automatic color scrollers and 900 dimmer lights.

== Architecture ==
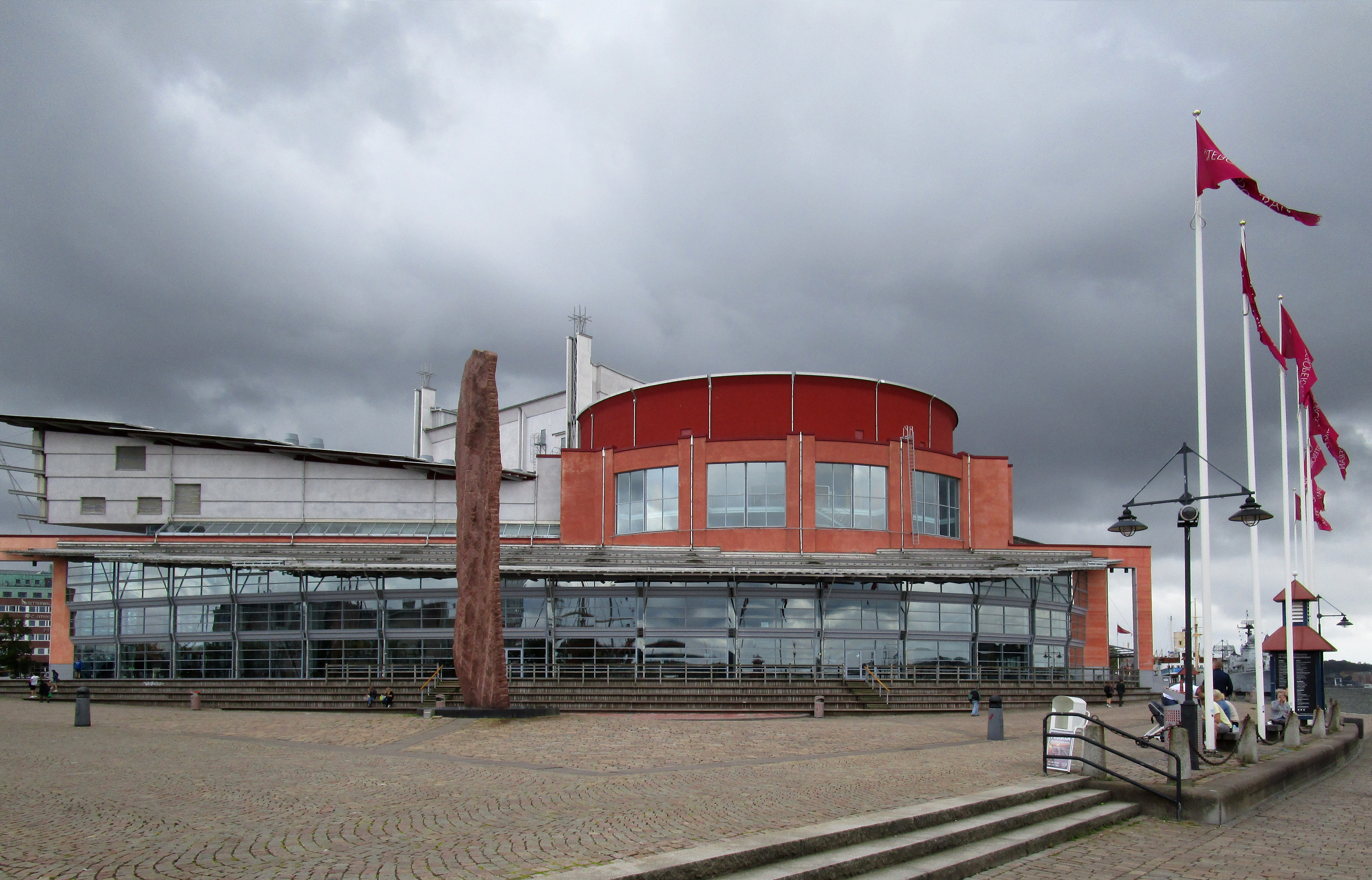
The Gothenburg Opera house, northern facade

The architect, Jan Izikowitz, shares his vision of the house:

The building should be possessed by an airiness that sends your mind soaring across the meandering landscape like wings of seagulls. Its shape should be inspired by its location, from the magnificent but elusive landscape with its light and open spaces, to the harbor's more tangible technical constructions; the bridges gracefully suspended across the water, the transparent framework of the harbor cranes, the strength, softness and elegance of the ships' hulls, the wings of seagulls and the flawless aerodynamic shape of sails.

He reflects on the operatic aspect of the design: "The world of opera should also be visible in the architecture: the rear stage wall as a large set piece, the colonnade as a series of symbolic gates and stage openings, the fly towers as gigantic lighting towers, the shape and color of the auditorium as an allusion to old traditions."

The overall size of the building is a reflection of the company's growth and its spread throughout the city. Therefore, the building attempts to encompass all the activities that were earlier spread out at six different locations are now housed in one building. Another reason is that the Gothenburg Opera should be able to offer as wide a selection of productions as possible, with the possibility of changing performance and art form from one night to another. There can be five assembled stage sets stored in the house at the same time, in five different areas the same size as the main stage. With the help of advanced modern technology, whole stage sets can be moved around, exchanged and assembled for the next performance.
