= Jämtland County (Riksdag constituency) =

Constituency of the Riksdag, the national legislature of Sweden

- Jämtlands Län
- Constituency for the Riksdag
- Location of Jämtland County within Sweden
- County: Jämtland
- Population: 132,736 (2025)
- Electorate: 103,333 (2026)
- Area: 54,051 km^{2} (2026)

Current constituency
- Created: 1970
- Seats: List (Note: Constituency seats only.): 4 (2010–present); 5 (1970–2010)
- Member of the Riksdag: List: Peter Eriksson (SD); Kalle Olsson (S); Elise Ryder Wikén (M); Anna-Caren Sätherberg (S)
- Created from: Jämtland County

Jämtland County (Swedish: Jämtlands Län) is one of the 29 multi-member constituencies of the Riksdag, the national legislature of Sweden. The constituency was established in 1970 when the Riksdag changed from a bicameral legislature to a unicameral legislature. It is conterminous with the county of Jämtland. The constituency currently elects four of the 349 members of the Riksdag using the open party-list proportional representation electoral system. At the 2026 general election it had 103,333 registered electors.

== Electoral system ==
Jämtland County currently elects four of the 349 members of the Riksdag using the open party-list proportional representation electoral system. Constituency seats are allocated using the modified Sainte-Laguë method. Only parties that reach the 4% national threshold and parties that receive at least 12% of the vote in the constituency compete for constituency seats. Supplementary levelling seats may also be allocated at the constituency level to parties that reach the 4% national threshold.

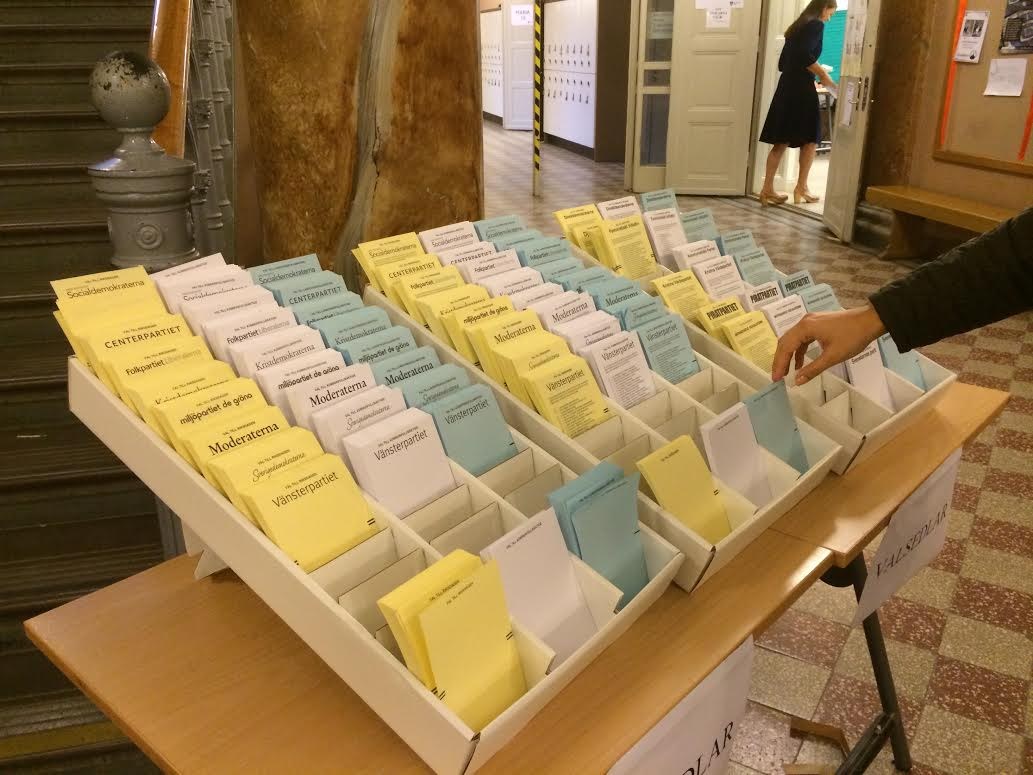
A selection of ballot papers available for voters at the 2014 general election in Stockholm - yellow for the Riksdag, blue for the regional council and white for the municipal council

Prior to 1997 voters could cast any ballot paper they wanted, though it had to contain the name of a party and the name of at least one candidate nominated by that party in the constituency. It was common for parties to hand out ballot papers with their name and list of candidates at the entrance of polling stations. Voters could delete the names of candidates or write-in the names of other candidates but in practice these options weren't used enough by voters to have any significant impact on the results and consequently elections operated as a closed system.

Since 1997, elections in Sweden follow the French model in having separate ballot papers for each party/list in a constituency. There are two ballot papers for each party - a party ballot paper (partivalsedel) with just the name of the party and a name ballot paper (namnvalsedel) with the name of the party and its list of candidates. There are also blank ballot papers (blank valsedel). Voters can initially pick as many ballot papers as they wish and then, in the secrecy of the voting booth, they select a single ballot paper of their choice. If they chose a name ballot paper they have the option of casting a preferential vote for one of their chosen party's candidates. If they chose a blank ballot paper they can write the name of any party including unregistered parties and, optionally, they can write the name of any person as their preferred candidate, even one that does not belong to their chosen party. They then place their chosen ballot paper in an envelope which is placed in the ballot box, discarding all other ballot papers they picked.

Seats won by each party/list in a constituency are allocated to its candidates in order of preference votes (a personal mandate), provided that the candidate has received at least 8% of votes cast for their party in the constituency (5% since January 2011). Any unfilled seats are then allocated to the party's remaining candidates in the order they appear on the party list (a party mandate).

== Election results ==
=== Summary ===
Election	Left V / VPK			Social Democrats S			Greens MP			Centre C			Liberals L / FP / F			Moderates M			Christian Democrats KD / KDS			Sweden Democrats SD		
Election	Votes	%	Seats	Votes	%	Seats	Votes	%	Seats	Votes	%	Seats	Votes	%	Seats	Votes	%	Seats	Votes	%	Seats	Votes	%	Seats
2026	5,227	6.02%	0	27,343	31.50%	2	5,762	6.64%	0	8,745	10.07%	0	3,072	3.54%	0	15,148	17.45%	1	4,736	5.46%	0	15,272	17.59%	1
2022	4,749	5.59%	0	30,666	36.07%	2	4,269	5.02%	0	7,771	9.14%	0	2,244	2.64%	0	12,574	14.79%	1	4,574	5.38%	0	17,097	20.11%	1
2018	7,179	8.42%	0	28,632	33.60%	1	3,049	3.58%	0	13,086	15.36%	1	2,439	2.86%	0	12,218	14.34%	1	4,118	4.83%	0	13,257	15.56%	1
2014	5,252	6.27%	0	33,303	39.78%	2	4,760	5.69%	0	9,487	11.33%	1	2,370	2.83%	0	14,513	17.34%	1	2,119	2.53%	0	9,224	11.02%	0
2010	5,340	6.52%	0	33,013	40.29%	2	5,339	6.52%	0	10,487	12.80%	1	3,155	3.85%	0	18,193	22.20%	1	2,340	2.86%	0	3,122	3.81%	0
2006	6,484	8.31%	0	31,322	40.15%	3	3,907	5.01%	0	13,111	16.81%	1	3,226	4.13%	0	13,753	17.63%	1	2,914	3.74%	0	1,224	1.57%	0
2002	8,469	11.02%	1	34,256	44.57%	3	3,967	5.16%	0	11,705	15.23%	1	5,569	7.25%	0	7,592	9.88%	0	3,874	5.04%	0	219	0.28%	0
1998	12,318	15.20%	1	33,436	41.27%	2	4,592	5.67%	0	9,807	12.10%	1	2,245	2.77%	0	11,156	13.77%	1	6,188	7.64%	0			
1994	6,009	6.79%	0	45,434	51.34%	3	5,137	5.81%	0	13,270	15.00%	1	3,940	4.45%	0	11,524	13.02%	1	2,087	2.36%	0			
1991	4,057	4.65%	0	39,201	44.88%	3	2,912	3.33%	0	14,699	16.83%	1	5,849	6.70%	0	11,641	13.33%	1	4,054	4.64%	0			
1988	4,752	5.49%	0	43,271	50.02%	3	4,306	4.98%	0	15,763	18.22%	1	4,752	5.49%	0	9,106	10.53%	1	1,683	1.95%	0			
1985	4,251	4.63%	0	47,107	51.32%	3	1,311	1.43%	0	18,046	19.66%	1	8,449	9.20%	0	12,509	13.63%	1	with C					
1982	4,282	4.62%	0	48,230	52.00%	3	1,497	1.61%	0	20,971	22.61%	1	3,643	3.93%	0	12,625	13.61%	1	1,431	1.54%	0			
1979	4,067	4.47%	0	45,898	50.41%	3				23,828	26.17%	2	5,688	6.25%	0	9,809	10.77%	0	1,231	1.35%	0			
1976	3,485	3.81%	0	43,850	47.94%	3				28,952	31.65%	2	6,395	6.99%	0	7,235	7.91%	0	1,232	1.35%	0			
1973	3,609	4.16%	0	41,791	48.16%	3				26,389	30.41%	2	6,336	7.30%	0	6,971	8.03%	0	1,267	1.46%	0			
1970	2,583	3.22%	0	39,995	49.80%	3				19,749	24.59%	2	9,199	11.45%	0	7,059	8.79%	0	1,363	1.70%	0			

(Excludes levelling seats. Figures in italics represent alliances/joint lists.)

=== Detailed ===
Party has received at least 4% of the vote nationally and is entitled to compete for constituency seats.

==== 2020s ====
===== 2026 =====
Results of the 2026 general election held on 13 September 2026:

Party		Votes per municipality								Total votes	%	Seats		
Party		Åre	Berg	Bräcke	Härje- dalen	Kro- kom	Öster- sund	Rag- unda	Ström- sund	Total votes	%	Con.	Lev.	Tot.
Swedish Social Democratic Party	S	2,220	1,253	1,246	1,915	2,854	14,546	1,076	2,233	27,343	31.50%	2	0	2
Sweden Democrats	SD	1,055	1,030	881	1,492	1,944	6,235	832	1,803	15,272	17.59%	1	0	1
Moderate Party	M	1,471	930	595	1,188	1,806	7,511	413	1,234	15,148	17.45%	1	0	1
Centre Party	C	1,201	467	291	540	1,168	4,344	242	492	8,745	10.07%	0	0	0
Green Party	MP	936	222	132	315	721	3,174	91	171	5,762	6.64%	0	0	0
Left Party	V	450	211	195	292	490	2,986	180	423	5,227	6.02%	0	0	0
Christian Democrats	KD	479	213	193	532	656	2,097	217	349	4,736	5.46%	0	0	0
Liberals	L	344	145	102	244	347	1,628	83	179	3,072	3.54%	0	0	0
Örebro Party	ÖP	47	37	33	38	89	245	17	46	552	0.64%	0	0	0
Alternative for Sweden	AfS	23	22	24	23	23	157	17	34	323	0.37%	0	0	0
Ambition Sweden	AS	16	23	11	46	34	78	11	12	231	0.27%	0	0	0
Pirate Party	PP	9	4	3	5	9	53	2	6	91	0.10%	0	0	0
Citizens' Coalition	MED	2	2	6	4	12	44	4	5	79	0.09%	0	0	0
Human Rights and Democracy	MoD	17	0	1	6	8	30	0	2	64	0.07%	0	0	0
Christian Values Party	KrVP	7	2	3	5	10	30	0	6	63	0.07%	0	0	0
Independent Rural Party	LPo	0	2	3	7	3	6	2	1	24	0.03%	0	0	0
Direct Democrats	DD	10	2	1	0	1	2	2	1	19	0.02%	0	0	0
Communist Party of Sweden	SKP	1	2	3	2	0	6	1	2	17	0.02%	0	0	0
Nordic Resistance Movement	NMR	0	0	0	0	2	4	0	4	10	0.01%	0	0	0
United Voice	ER	0	0	1	0	1	4	0	0	6	0.01%	0	0	0
Unity	ENH	0	0	1	0	1	4	0	0	6	0.01%	0	0	0
Volt Sweden	Volt	1	0	0	1	0	2	0	0	4	0.00%	0	0	0
A Good Sweden		0	0	0	1	0	2	0	0	3	0.00%	0	0	0
Donald Duck Party		0	1	0	0	0	1	0	1	3	0.00%	0	0	0
The Push Buttons	Kn	0	1	0	1	0	1	0	0	3	0.00%	0	0	0
Turning Point Party	PV	3	0	0	0	0	0	0	0	3	0.00%	0	0	0
Classical Liberal Party	KLP	0	0	0	0	0	0	2	0	2	0.00%	0	0	0
Communist Party	K	0	0	0	0	0	1	0	0	1	0.00%	0	0	0
Freedom of the Family		0	0	0	0	0	1	0	0	1	0.00%	0	0	0
RegleraAI.nu		1	0	0	0	0	0	0	0	1	0.00%	0	0	0
Secular Humanist Party		0	0	0	0	0	1	0	0	1	0.00%	0	0	0
Social Liberals		0	0	0	0	0	0	0	1	1	0.00%	0	0	0
Sweden in an Electoral Alliance		0	0	0	0	0	1	0	0	1	0.00%	0	0	0
Valid votes		8,293	4,569	3,725	6,657	10,179	43,194	3,192	7,005	86,814	100.00%	4	0	4
Blank votes		103	52	57	72	116	431	50	111	992	1.13%			
Rejected votes – unregistered parties		0	1	1	2	1	8	2	1	16	0.02%			
Rejected votes – other		9	6	0	9	6	56	2	10	98	0.11%			
Rejected votes		8,405	4,628	3,783	6,740	10,302	43,689	3,246	7,127	87,920	85.08%			
Registered electors		9,666	5,539	4,703	8,042	11,851	51,074	3,950	8,508	103,333				
Turnout		86.95%	83.55%	80.44%	83.81%	86.93%	85.54%	82.18%	83.77%	85.08%				

The following candidates were elected:

- Constituency seats (personal mandates) - Kalle Olsson (S), 1,608 votes; Elise Ryder Wikén (M), 1,089 votes; and Anna-Caren Sätherberg (S), 1,500 votes.
- Constituency seats (party mandates) - Peter Eriksson (SD), 147 votes.

===== 2022 =====
Results of the 2022 general election held on 11 September 2022:

Party		Votes per municipality								Total votes	%	Seats		
Party		Åre	Berg	Bräcke	Härje- dalen	Kro- kom	Öster- sund	Rag- unda	Ström- sund	Total votes	%	Con.	Lev.	Tot.
Swedish Social Democratic Party	S	2,497	1,476	1,446	2,233	3,231	15,756	1,285	2,742	30,666	36.07%	2	0	2
Sweden Democrats	SD	1,290	1,115	1,086	1,708	2,084	6,936	902	1,976	17,097	20.11%	1	0	1
Moderate Party	M	1,231	788	516	897	1,524	6,446	308	864	12,574	14.79%	1	0	1
Centre Party	C	920	434	320	535	1,051	3,728	288	495	7,771	9.14%	0	0	0
Left Party	V	425	198	181	370	521	2,492	180	382	4,749	5.59%	0	0	0
Christian Democrats	KD	380	260	187	452	594	2,099	195	407	4,574	5.38%	0	0	0
Green Party	MP	663	153	99	203	496	2,435	82	138	4,269	5.02%	0	0	0
Liberals	L	281	63	48	202	195	1,310	38	107	2,244	2.64%	0	0	0
Alternative for Sweden	AfS	12	13	16	19	25	122	15	25	247	0.29%	0	0	0
Citizens' Coalition	MED	24	5	2	9	15	77	4	7	143	0.17%	0	0	0
Pirate Party	PP	12	4	7	10	7	84	6	10	140	0.16%	0	0	0
Human Rights and Democracy	MoD	8	10	1	21	13	52	1	10	116	0.14%	0	0	0
The Push Buttons	Kn	4	19	4	4	16	56	2	1	106	0.12%	0	0	0
Independent Rural Party	LPo	14	7	8	7	10	26	13	12	97	0.11%	0	0	0
Christian Values Party	KrVP	6	1	0	2	5	25	2	7	48	0.06%	0	0	0
Nuance Party	PNy	0	2	1	0	2	37	0	4	46	0.05%	0	0	0
Feminist Initiative	FI	3	1	3	6	6	13	0	2	34	0.04%	0	0	0
Direct Democrats	DD	2	2	2	0	2	14	0	1	23	0.03%	0	0	0
Unity	ENH	4	1	2	1	1	12	0	0	21	0.02%	0	0	0
Climate Alliance	KA	2	0	0	3	3	11	0	0	19	0.02%	0	0	0
Nordic Resistance Movement	NMR	0	0	0	0	2	4	0	3	9	0.01%	0	0	0
Classical Liberal Party	KLP	0	1	0	0	0	6	1	0	8	0.01%	0	0	0
Communist Party of Sweden	SKP	0	0	0	4	1	2	1	0	8	0.01%	0	0	0
Sweden Out of the EU/Free Justice Party		0	0	1	1	1	0	1	1	5	0.01%	0	0	0
Donald Duck Party		0	1	0	0	0	1	0	0	2	0.00%	0	0	0
Swexit Party		0	0	0	0	0	2	0	0	2	0.00%	0	0	0
Turning Point Party	PV	1	0	0	0	0	1	0	0	2	0.00%	0	0	0
Basic Income Party	BASIP	0	0	0	0	0	1	0	0	1	0.00%	0	0	0
Freedom of the Family		0	0	0	0	0	1	0	0	1	0.00%	0	0	0
Hard Line Sweden		0	0	0	1	0	0	0	0	1	0.00%	0	0	0
Stora Norrland's Independent Freedom Party		0	0	0	0	0	0	0	1	1	0.00%	0	0	0
Valid votes		7,779	4,554	3,930	6,688	9,805	41,749	3,324	7,195	85,024	100.00%	4	0	4
Blank votes		98	68	54	88	106	449	51	95	1,009	1.17%			
Rejected votes – unregistered parties		0	1	2	0	1	14	0	1	19	0.02%			
Rejected votes – other		3	2	2	2	7	45	1	4	66	0.08%			
Total polled		7,880	4,625	3,988	6,778	9,919	42,257	3,376	7,295	86,118	84.96%			
Registered electors		9,076	5,527	4,820	8,125	11,366	49,635	3,983	8,831	101,363				
Turnout		86.82%	83.68%	82.74%	83.42%	87.27%	85.14%	84.76%	82.61%	84.96%				

The following candidates were elected:

- Constituency seats (personal mandates) - Kalle Olsson (S), 1,852 votes; Saila Quicklund (M), 993 votes; and Anna-Caren Sätherberg (S), 2,238 votes.
- Constituency seats (party mandates) - Josef Fransson (SD), 3 votes.

==== 2010s ====
===== 2018 =====
Results of the 2018 general election held on 9 September 2018:

Party		Votes per municipality								Total votes	%	Seats		
Party		Åre	Berg	Bräcke	Härje- dalen	Kro- kom	Öster- sund	Rag- unda	Ström- sund	Total votes	%	Con.	Lev.	Tot.
Swedish Social Democratic Party	S	1,911	1,475	1,576	2,339	2,920	14,047	1,293	3,071	28,632	33.60%	1	1	2
Sweden Democrats	SD	960	906	793	1,258	1,463	5,605	720	1,552	13,257	15.56%	1	0	1
Centre Party	C	1,577	779	586	933	1,757	5,998	510	946	13,086	15.36%	1	0	1
Moderate Party	M	1,127	704	514	936	1,325	6,576	272	764	12,218	14.34%	1	0	1
Left Party	V	602	290	307	476	781	3,829	318	576	7,179	8.42%	0	0	0
Christian Democrats	KD	348	210	161	288	528	2,139	137	307	4,118	4.83%	0	0	0
Green Party	MP	451	103	58	126	293	1,858	53	107	3,049	3.58%	0	0	0
Liberals	L	197	77	60	186	218	1,564	57	80	2,439	2.86%	0	0	0
Feminist Initiative	FI	31	17	16	25	23	227	17	18	374	0.44%	0	0	0
Independent Rural Party	LPo	25	20	17	86	20	21	39	8	236	0.28%	0	0	0
Alternative for Sweden	AfS	17	9	11	26	28	106	13	15	225	0.26%	0	0	0
Citizens' Coalition	MED	16	4	7	0	9	76	2	3	117	0.14%	0	0	0
Unity	ENH	9	10	6	2	7	39	2	5	80	0.09%	0	0	0
Direct Democrats	DD	4	2	13	3	10	29	3	2	66	0.08%	0	0	0
Pirate Party	PP	6	0	3	1	5	29	4	11	59	0.07%	0	0	0
Christian Values Party	KrVP	8	0	0	1	1	8	0	4	22	0.03%	0	0	0
Animal Party	DjuP	3	4	2	1	0	6	1	1	18	0.02%	0	0	0
Nordic Resistance Movement	NMR	2	0	1	1	0	8	1	0	13	0.02%	0	0	0
Classical Liberal Party	KLP	0	0	0	3	1	4	0	2	10	0.01%	0	0	0
Basic Income Party	BASIP	0	0	0	0	1	0	2	2	5	0.01%	0	0	0
Communist Party of Sweden	SKP	0	0	0	3	0	1	0	0	4	0.00%	0	0	0
Initiative	INI	0	0	0	0	1	3	0	0	4	0.00%	0	0	0
European Workers Party	EAP	1	0	0	0	0	0	0	0	1	0.00%	0	0	0
Security Party	TRP	0	0	0	0	0	1	0	0	1	0.00%	0	0	0
Parties not on the ballot		2	0	0	3	0	2	2	1	10	0.01%	0	0	0
Valid votes		7,297	4,610	4,131	6,697	9,391	42,176	3,446	7,475	85,223	100.00%	4	1	5
Blank votes		82	46	51	73	123	378	47	103	903	1.05%			
Rejected votes – unregistered parties		3	1	2	0	1	14	0	2	23	0.03%			
Rejected votes – other		2	2	1	2	4	29	1	6	47	0.05%			
Total polled		7,384	4,659	4,185	6,772	9,519	42,597	3,494	7,586	86,196	87.06%			
Registered electors		8,330	5,443	4,921	8,016	10,751	48,471	4,091	8,989	99,012				
Turnout		88.64%	85.60%	85.04%	84.48%	88.54%	87.88%	85.41%	84.39%	87.06%				

The following candidates were elected:

- Constituency seats (personal mandates) - Per Åsling (C), 2,069 votes; Kalle Olsson (S), 2,941 votes; and Saila Quicklund (M), 1,632 votes.
- Constituency seats (party mandates) - Cassandra Sundin (SD), 70 votes.
- Levelling seats (party mandates) - Anna-Caren Sätherberg (S), 1,367 votes.

===== 2014 =====
Results of the 2014 general election held on 14 September 2014:

Party		Votes per municipality								Total votes	%	Seats		
Party		Åre	Berg	Bräcke	Härje- dalen	Kro- kom	Öster- sund	Rag- unda	Ström- sund	Total votes	%	Con.	Lev.	Tot.
Swedish Social Democratic Party	S	2,151	1,855	2,002	2,903	3,421	15,394	1,719	3,858	33,303	39.78%	2	0	2
Moderate Party	M	1,467	809	551	1,160	1,631	7,670	333	892	14,513	17.34%	1	0	1
Centre Party	C	932	742	492	707	1,443	3,929	454	788	9,487	11.33%	1	0	1
Sweden Democrats	SD	640	671	533	1,027	988	3,782	491	1,092	9,224	11.02%	0	0	0
Left Party	V	332	216	260	349	615	2,669	255	556	5,252	6.27%	0	0	0
Green Party	MP	601	179	120	200	432	2,960	97	171	4,760	5.69%	0	0	0
Liberal People's Party	FP	208	84	86	142	216	1,508	43	83	2,370	2.83%	0	0	0
Christian Democrats	KD	270	82	57	130	259	1,103	58	160	2,119	2.53%	0	0	0
Feminist Initiative	FI	163	84	54	100	185	1,283	64	102	2,035	2.43%	0	0	0
Pirate Party	PP	20	20	18	12	27	180	9	21	307	0.37%	0	0	0
Independent Rural Party	LPo	3	5	35	17	7	12	20	11	110	0.13%	0	0	0
Unity	ENH	6	2	7	6	13	37	3	4	78	0.09%	0	0	0
Party of the Swedes	SVP	1	4	5	1	3	11	1	7	33	0.04%	0	0	0
Animal Party	DjuP	1	0	0	6	4	11	2	4	28	0.03%	0	0	0
Christian Values Party	KrVP	1	1	0	1	5	16	0	3	27	0.03%	0	0	0
Classical Liberal Party	KLP	6	1	0	2	0	9	2	0	20	0.02%	0	0	0
Direct Democrats	DD	1	0	2	1	2	4	0	0	10	0.01%	0	0	0
Socialist Justice Party	RS	0	0	2	0	0	5	0	0	7	0.01%	0	0	0
Progressive Party		0	0	0	0	0	3	0	0	3	0.00%	0	0	0
Communist Party of Sweden	SKP	0	0	0	0	0	2	0	0	2	0.00%	0	0	0
European Workers Party	EAP	1	0	0	0	0	0	0	0	1	0.00%	0	0	0
Health Party		0	0	0	0	1	0	0	0	1	0.00%	0	0	0
Swedish Senior Citizen Interest Party	SPI	0	0	0	0	0	0	0	1	1	0.00%	0	0	0
Parties not on the ballot		2	2	2	1	1	13	0	2	23	0.03%	0	0	0
Valid votes		6,806	4,757	4,226	6,765	9,253	40,601	3,551	7,755	83,714	100.00%	4	0	4
Blank votes		86	41	49	73	99	396	46	98	888	1.05%			
Rejected votes – other		1	1	1	4	1	13	2	1	24	0.03%			
Total polled		6,893	4,799	4,276	6,842	9,353	41,010	3,599	7,854	84,626	85.32%			
Registered electors		8,003	5,653	5,097	8,264	10,910	47,588	4,311	9,366	99,192				
Turnout		86.13%	84.89%	83.89%	82.79%	85.73%	86.18%	83.48%	83.86%	85.32%				

The following candidates were elected:

- Constituency seats (personal mandates) - Per Åsling (C), 2,378 votes; Kalle Olsson (S), 3,523 votes; Saila Quicklund (M), 2,264 votes; and Anna-Caren Sätherberg (S), 2,400 votes.

===== 2010 =====
Results of the 2010 general election held on 19 September 2010:

Party		Votes per municipality								Total votes	%	Seats		
Party		Åre	Berg	Bräcke	Härje- dalen	Kro- kom	Öster- sund	Rag- unda	Ström- sund	Total votes	%	Con.	Lev.	Tot.
Swedish Social Democratic Party	S	2,052	1,842	2,178	3,004	3,302	14,844	1,799	3,992	33,013	40.29%	2	0	2
Moderate Party	M	1,732	998	767	1,498	1,905	9,384	523	1,386	18,193	22.20%	1	0	1
Centre Party	C	949	819	530	634	1,619	4,598	491	847	10,487	12.80%	1	0	1
Left Party	V	315	247	298	404	570	2,575	283	648	5,340	6.52%	0	0	0
Green Party	MP	564	248	167	256	557	3,193	125	229	5,339	6.52%	0	0	0
Liberal People's Party	FP	338	125	149	258	287	1,753	63	182	3,155	3.85%	0	0	0
Sweden Democrats	SD	204	217	172	470	311	1,231	136	381	3,122	3.81%	0	0	0
Christian Democrats	KD	257	120	59	158	289	1,234	55	168	2,340	2.86%	0	0	0
Pirate Party	PP	40	24	27	28	44	252	17	24	456	0.56%	0	0	0
Feminist Initiative	FI	23	4	7	8	23	155	12	5	237	0.29%	0	0	0
Norrland Coalition Party		2	2	5	8	12	42	45	20	136	0.17%	0	0	0
Rural Democrats		7	19	5	5	0	1	0	3	40	0.05%	0	0	0
Socialist Justice Party	RS	1	0	3	0	0	10	0	0	14	0.02%	0	0	0
Freedom Party		0	3	0	1	4	2	0	0	10	0.01%	0	0	0
Classical Liberal Party	KLP	1	0	0	0	1	6	0	0	8	0.01%	0	0	0
National Democrats	ND	1	0	0	0	0	2	0	5	8	0.01%	0	0	0
European Workers Party	EAP	1	0	0	0	1	1	0	1	4	0.00%	0	0	0
Party of the Swedes	SVP	0	0	0	0	1	2	0	1	4	0.00%	0	0	0
Unity	ENH	0	0	0	2	0	2	0	0	4	0.00%	0	0	0
Communist Party of Sweden	SKP	0	0	0	1	1	1	0	0	3	0.00%	0	0	0
Spirits Party		0	0	0	0	0	2	1	0	3	0.00%	0	0	0
Swedish Senior Citizen Interest Party	SPI	0	0	0	0	0	1	0	0	1	0.00%	0	0	0
Parties not on the ballot		0	2	1	4	0	6	2	4	19	0.02%	0	0	0
Valid votes		6,487	4,670	4,368	6,739	8,927	39,297	3,552	7,896	81,936	100.00%	4	0	4
Blank votes		124	78	59	117	161	496	71	145	1,251	1.50%			
Rejected votes – other		1	1	1	1	2	6	2	2	16	0.02%			
Total polled		6,612	4,749	4,428	6,857	9,090	39,799	3,625	8,043	83,203	83.08%			
Registered electors		7,926	5,901	5,391	8,510	10,931	47,215	4,506	9,764	100,144				
Turnout		83.42%	80.48%	82.14%	80.58%	83.16%	84.29%	80.45%	82.37%	83.08%				

The following candidates were elected:

- Constituency seats (personal mandates) - Per Åsling (C), 3,488 votes; Marie Nordén (S), 3,059 votes; and Saila Quicklund (M), 2,023 votes.
- Constituency seats (party mandates) - Gunnar Sandberg (S), 1,727 votes.

==== 2000s ====
===== 2006 =====
Results of the 2006 general election held on 17 September 2006:

Party		Votes per municipality								Total votes	%	Seats		
Party		Åre	Berg	Bräcke	Härje- dalen	Kro- kom	Öster- sund	Rag- unda	Ström- sund	Total votes	%	Con.	Lev.	Tot.
Swedish Social Democratic Party	S	1,883	1,631	2,034	3,023	3,169	14,052	1,597	3,933	31,322	40.15%	3	0	3
Moderate Party	M	1,380	745	632	1,137	1,319	6,985	432	1,123	13,753	17.63%	1	0	1
Centre Party	C	1,117	1,104	629	852	1,832	5,787	625	1,165	13,111	16.81%	1	0	1
Left Party	V	376	349	410	542	603	2,979	396	829	6,484	8.31%	0	0	0
Green Party	MP	402	197	134	153	469	2,273	99	180	3,907	5.01%	0	0	0
Liberal People's Party	FP	257	99	128	312	294	1,823	92	221	3,226	4.13%	0	0	0
Christian Democrats	KD	298	189	95	251	340	1,405	99	237	2,914	3.74%	0	0	0
Sweden Democrats	SD	90	76	54	179	132	471	67	155	1,224	1.57%	0	0	0
June List		62	101	54	81	103	341	46	113	901	1.15%	0	0	0
Pirate Party	PP	45	25	30	39	58	302	20	53	572	0.73%	0	0	0
Feminist Initiative	FI	19	16	6	18	40	197	7	13	316	0.41%	0	0	0
New Future	NYF	8	3	11	12	13	38	3	15	103	0.13%	0	0	0
Swedish Senior Citizen Interest Party	SPI	3	2	2	7	5	7	3	18	47	0.06%	0	0	0
Unity	ENH	0	2	2	1	4	26	3	1	39	0.05%	0	0	0
Health Care Party	Sjvåp	5	2	1	1	4	15	0	1	29	0.04%	0	0	0
People's Will		0	0	0	4	0	15	0	6	25	0.03%	0	0	0
Socialist Justice Party	RS	0	0	2	0	0	10	0	0	12	0.02%	0	0	0
National Socialist Front		2	0	0	1	0	2	1	2	8	0.01%	0	0	0
Freedom of the Justice Party		4	0	0	0	0	0	0	0	4	0.01%	0	0	0
The Communists	KOMM	1	1	0	0	0	1	0	0	3	0.00%	0	0	0
National Democrats	ND	0	0	0	0	0	2	0	0	2	0.00%	0	0	0
Unique Party		0	1	0	0	0	1	0	0	2	0.00%	0	0	0
Kvinnokraft		0	0	0	0	0	1	0	0	1	0.00%	0	0	0
Other parties		0	1	0	0	2	8	1	1	13	0.02%	0	0	0
Valid votes		5,952	4,544	4,224	6,613	8,387	36,741	3,491	8,066	78,018	100.00%	5	0	5
Blank votes		149	91	88	130	185	809	91	144	1,687	2.12%			
Rejected votes – other		0	5	2	3	1	8	0	4	23	0.03%			
Total polled		6,101	4,640	4,314	6,746	8,573	37,558	3,582	8,214	79,728	79.82%			
Registered electors		7,664	6,015	5,563	8,698	10,709	46,354	4,650	10,235	99,888				
Turnout		79.61%	77.14%	77.55%	77.56%	80.05%	81.02%	77.03%	80.25%	79.82%				

The following candidates were elected:

- Constituency seats (personal mandates) - Per Åsling (C), 2,883 votes; and Ola Sundell (M), 1,686 votes.
- Constituency seats (party mandates) - Berit Andnor (S), 2,277 votes; Marie Nordén (S), 1,363 votes; and Gunnar Sandberg (S), 1,535 votes.

===== 2002 =====
Results of the 2002 general election held on 15 September 2002:

Party		Votes per municipality								Total votes	%	Seats		
Party		Åre	Berg	Bräcke	Härje- dalen	Kro- kom	Öster- sund	Rag- unda	Ström- sund	Total votes	%	Con.	Lev.	Tot.
Swedish Social Democratic Party	S	2,106	1,845	2,237	3,341	3,414	15,378	1,742	4,193	34,256	44.57%	3	0	3
Centre Party	C	965	1,046	639	771	1,685	4,698	634	1,267	11,705	15.23%	1	0	1
Left Party	V	488	474	490	809	781	3,903	422	1,102	8,469	11.02%	1	0	1
Moderate Party	M	690	405	356	650	743	3,942	270	536	7,592	9.88%	0	1	1
Liberal People's Party	FP	436	255	236	404	439	3,271	141	387	5,569	7.25%	0	0	0
Green Party	MP	377	253	140	245	522	2,065	112	253	3,967	5.16%	0	0	0
Christian Democrats	KD	394	321	111	310	421	1,850	114	353	3,874	5.04%	0	0	0
New Future	NYF	60	57	50	80	113	259	71	98	788	1.03%	0	0	0
Sweden Democrats	SD	8	14	5	20	24	119	6	23	219	0.28%	0	0	0
Voice of the Free People		99	39	2	4	3	59	1	0	207	0.27%	0	0	0
Swedish Senior Citizen Interest Party	SPI	7	6	6	3	0	17	4	6	49	0.06%	0	0	0
Norrbotten Party	NBP	1	2	0	5	7	9	3	6	33	0.04%	0	0	0
Socialist Justice Party	RS	0	0	2	0	0	3	0	0	5	0.01%	0	0	0
Unity	ENH	0	0	0	0	0	4	0	0	4	0.01%	0	0	0
The Communists	KOMM	0	0	0	0	0	0	0	1	1	0.00%	0	0	0
Rikshushållarna		0	0	0	0	0	0	0	1	1	0.00%	0	0	0
Other parties		9	12	9	8	8	44	6	30	126	0.16%	0	0	0
Valid votes		5,640	4,729	4,283	6,650	8,160	35,621	3,526	8,256	76,865	100.00%	5	1	6
Rejected votes		85	58	39	88	121	536	54	96	1,077	1.38%			
Total polled		5,725	4,787	4,322	6,738	8,281	36,157	3,580	8,352	77,942	77.85%			
Registered electors		7,225	6,202	5,763	8,998	10,526	45,963	4,797	10,650	100,124				
Turnout		79.24%	77.18%	75.00%	74.88%	78.67%	78.67%	74.63%	78.42%	77.85%				

The following candidates were elected:

- Constituency seats (personal mandates) - Håkan Larsson (C), 2,652 votes; Camilla Sköld Jansson (V), 1,151 votes; and Margareta Winberg (S), 6,155 votes.
- Constituency seats (party mandates) - Berit Andnor (S), 570 votes; and Rune Berglund (S), 1,063 votes.
- Levelling seats (personal mandates) - Ola Sundell (M), 1,904 votes.

Permanent substitutions:

- Margareta Winberg (S) resigned on 30 October 2003 and was replaced by Gunnar Sandberg (S) on 31 October 2003.

==== 1990s ====
===== 1998 =====
Results of the 1998 general election held on 20 September 1998:

Party		Votes per municipality								Total votes	%	Seats		
Party		Åre	Berg	Bräcke	Härje- dalen	Kro- kom	Öster- sund	Rag- unda	Ström- sund	Total votes	%	Con.	Lev.	Tot.
Swedish Social Democratic Party	S	1,978	1,820	2,296	3,333	3,397	14,316	1,840	4,456	33,436	41.27%	2	0	2
Left Party	V	809	691	825	1,210	1,180	5,277	700	1,626	12,318	15.20%	1	0	1
Moderate Party	M	898	574	494	913	1,076	6,027	400	774	11,156	13.77%	1	0	1
Centre Party	C	933	1,006	556	578	1,358	3,688	577	1,111	9,807	12.10%	1	0	1
Christian Democrats	KD	562	394	194	475	673	3,185	169	536	6,188	7.64%	0	0	0
Green Party	MP	408	285	212	281	573	2,330	187	316	4,592	5.67%	0	0	0
Liberal People's Party	FP	209	97	100	198	174	1,193	62	212	2,245	2.77%	0	0	0
Other parties		77	102	83	141	112	536	106	126	1,283	1.58%	0	0	0
Valid votes		5,874	4,969	4,760	7,129	8,543	36,552	4,041	9,157	81,025	100.00%	5	0	5
Rejected votes		122	64	53	101	140	693	61	120	1,354	1.64%			
Total polled		5,996	5,033	4,813	7,230	8,683	37,245	4,102	9,277	82,379	80.50%			
Registered electors		7,320	6,443	6,110	9,342	10,701	45,880	5,075	11,469	102,340				
Turnout		81.91%	78.12%	78.77%	77.39%	81.14%	81.18%	80.83%	80.89%	80.50%				

The following candidates were elected:

- Constituency seats (personal mandates) - Erik A. Egervärn (C), 1,846 votes; Ola Sundell (M), 1,953 votes; Camilla Sköld (V), 1,849 votes; and Margareta Winberg (S), 6,015 votes.
- Constituency seats (party mandates) - Rune Berglund (S), 1,072 votes.

===== 1994 =====
Results of the 1994 general election held on 18 September 1994:

Party		Votes per municipality								Total votes	%	Seats		
Party		Åre	Berg	Bräcke	Härje- dalen	Kro- kom	Öster- sund	Rag- unda	Ström- sund	Total votes	%	Con.	Lev.	Tot.
Swedish Social Democratic Party	S	2,748	2,530	3,257	4,664	4,529	19,220	2,517	5,969	45,434	51.34%	3	0	3
Centre Party	C	1,320	1,378	801	872	1,761	4,832	728	1,578	13,270	15.00%	1	0	1
Moderate Party	M	916	585	543	947	1,091	6,196	418	828	11,524	13.02%	1	0	1
Left Party	V	359	302	364	577	570	2,679	381	777	6,009	6.79%	0	0	0
Green Party	MP	458	255	255	400	598	2,522	245	404	5,137	5.81%	0	0	0
Liberal People's Party	FP	296	148	144	314	334	2,257	94	353	3,940	4.45%	0	0	0
Christian Democratic Unity	KDS	188	120	62	135	269	1,039	70	204	2,087	2.36%	0	0	0
New Democracy	NyD	32	29	16	53	45	238	14	47	474	0.54%	0	0	0
Other parties		53	57	26	62	83	238	26	68	613	0.69%	0	0	0
Valid votes		6,370	5,404	5,468	8,024	9,280	39,221	4,493	10,228	88,488	100.00%	5	0	5
Rejected votes		72	53	48	92	101	503	37	92	998	1.12%			
Total polled		6,442	5,457	5,516	8,116	9,381	39,724	4,530	10,320	89,486	85.56%			
Registered electors		7,473	6,570	6,480	9,789	10,835	46,076	5,269	12,099	104,591				
Turnout		86.20%	83.06%	85.12%	82.91%	86.58%	86.21%	85.97%	85.30%	85.56%				

The following candidates were elected: Berit Andnor (S); Rune Berglund (S); Erik A. Egervärn (C); Ola Sundell (M); and Margareta Winberg (S).

===== 1991 =====
Results of the 1991 general election held on 15 September 1991:

Party		Votes per municipality								Total votes	%	Seats		
Party		Åre	Berg	Bräcke	Härje- dalen	Kro- kom	Öster- sund	Rag- unda	Ström- sund	Total votes	%	Con.	Lev.	Tot.
Swedish Social Democratic Party	S	2,318	2,241	2,905	4,124	3,733	15,923	2,364	5,593	39,201	44.88%	3	0	3
Centre Party	C	1,329	1,531	906	1,029	1,943	5,264	883	1,814	14,699	16.83%	1	0	1
Moderate Party	M	939	582	579	976	1,078	6,268	389	830	11,641	13.33%	1	0	1
Liberal People's Party	FP	461	206	244	445	457	3,377	145	514	5,849	6.70%	0	0	0
New Democracy	NyD	443	345	262	498	418	1,807	202	404	4,379	5.01%	0	0	0
Left Party	V	249	190	283	397	371	1,777	210	580	4,057	4.65%	0	0	0
Christian Democratic Unity	KDS	341	258	160	240	497	1,936	198	424	4,054	4.64%	0	0	0
Green Party	MP	269	140	133	216	334	1,443	129	248	2,912	3.33%	0	0	0
Other parties		30	19	28	134	30	179	70	55	545	0.62%	0	0	0
Valid votes		6,379	5,512	5,500	8,059	8,861	37,974	4,590	10,462	87,337	100.00%	5	0	5
Rejected votes		106	61	69	115	147	659	53	136	1,346	1.52%			
Total polled		6,485	5,573	5,569	8,174	9,008	38,633	4,643	10,598	88,683	84.70%			
Registered electors		7,583	6,750	6,641	9,851	10,621	45,260	5,485	12,509	104,700				
Turnout		85.52%	82.56%	83.86%	82.98%	84.81%	85.36%	84.65%	84.72%	84.70%				

The following candidates were elected: Berit Andnor (S); Stina Eliasson (C); Nils-Olof Gustafsson (S); Ingrid Hemmingsson (M); and Margareta Winberg (S).

==== 1980s ====
===== 1988 =====
Results of the 1988 general election held on 18 September 1988:

Party		Votes per municipality								Total votes	%	Seats		
Party		Åre	Berg	Bräcke	Härje- dalen	Kro- kom	Öster- sund	Rag- unda	Ström- sund	Total votes	%	Con.	Lev.	Tot.
Swedish Social Democratic Party	S	2,641	2,450	3,232	4,550	4,081	17,416	2,662	6,239	43,271	50.02%	3	0	3
Centre Party	C	1,442	1,678	980	1,131	2,102	5,506	959	1,965	15,763	18.22%	1	0	1
Moderate Party	M	689	541	467	728	850	4,810	297	724	9,106	10.53%	1	0	1
Liberal People's Party	FP	687	316	296	601	569	4,224	227	609	7,529	8.70%	0	0	0
Left Party – Communists	VPK	293	200	310	488	392	2,244	247	578	4,752	5.49%	0	0	0
Green Party	MP	374	241	239	391	420	1,981	241	419	4,306	4.98%	0	0	0
Christian Democratic Unity	KDS	151	119	51	103	228	735	75	221	1,683	1.95%	0	0	0
Other parties		11	3	6	15	5	51	4	8	103	0.12%	0	0	0
Valid votes		6,288	5,548	5,581	8,007	8,647	36,967	4,712	10,763	86,513	100.00%	5	0	5
Rejected votes		55	40	50	74	78	459	29	72	857	0.98%			
Total polled		6,343	5,588	5,631	8,081	8,725	37,426	4,741	10,835	87,370	84.21%			
Registered electors		7,524	6,723	6,625	9,959	10,286	44,287	5,579	12,764	103,747				
Turnout		84.30%	83.12%	85.00%	81.14%	84.82%	84.51%	84.98%	84.89%	84.21%				

The following candidates were elected: Stina Eliasson (C); Nils-Olof Gustafsson (S); Ingrid Hemmingsson (M); Marianne Stålberg (S); and Margareta Winberg (S).

Permanent substitutions:

- Marianne Stålberg (S) resigned on 31 December 1990 and was replaced by Bo Toresson (S) on 1 January 1991.
- Bo Toresson (S) resigned on 10 January 1991 and was replaced by Rune Berglund (S) on 11 January 1991.

===== 1985 =====
Results of the 1985 general election held on 15 September 1985:

Party		Votes per municipality								Total votes	%	Seats		
Party		Åre	Berg	Bräcke	Härje- dalen	Kro- kom	Öster- sund	Rag- unda	Ström- sund	Total votes	%	Con.	Lev.	Tot.
Swedish Social Democratic Party	S	2,909	2,580	3,608	5,107	4,275	18,699	3,025	6,904	47,107	51.32%	3	0	3
Centre Party	C	1,623	1,909	1,174	1,347	2,474	6,129	1,082	2,308	18,046	19.66%	1	0	1
Moderate Party	M	1,000	766	648	1,063	1,173	6,300	446	1,113	12,509	13.63%	1	0	1
Liberal People's Party	FP	715	389	343	630	726	4,707	309	630	8,449	9.20%	0	0	0
Left Party – Communists	VPK	266	200	318	398	379	1,927	234	529	4,251	4.63%	0	0	0
Green Party	MP	118	51	51	118	149	625	82	117	1,311	1.43%	0	0	0
Other parties		13	4	4	8	11	58	7	15	120	0.13%	0	0	0
Valid votes		6,644	5,899	6,146	8,671	9,187	38,445	5,185	11,616	91,793	100.00%	5	0	5
Rejected votes		70	28	31	63	59	366	43	57	717	0.78%			
Total polled		6,714	5,927	6,177	8,734	9,246	38,811	5,228	11,673	92,510	88.34%			
Registered electors		7,637	6,884	6,916	10,195	10,405	43,655	5,830	13,200	104,722				
Turnout		87.91%	86.10%	89.31%	85.67%	88.86%	88.90%	89.67%	88.43%	88.34%				

The following candidates were elected: Nils G. Åsling (C); Nils-Olof Gustafsson (S); Ingrid Hemmingsson (M); Marianne Stålberg (S); and Margareta Winberg (S).

===== 1982 =====
Results of the 1982 general election held on 19 September 1982:

Party		Votes per municipality								Total votes	%	Seats		
Party		Åre	Berg	Bräcke	Härje- dalen	Kro- kom	Öster- sund	Rag- unda	Ström- sund	Total votes	%	Con.	Lev.	Tot.
Swedish Social Democratic Party	S	2,857	2,762	3,835	5,218	4,286	18,944	3,132	7,196	48,230	52.00%	3	0	3
Centre Party	C	1,789	2,067	1,293	1,637	2,671	7,641	1,242	2,631	20,971	22.61%	1	0	1
Moderate Party	M	1,006	760	682	999	1,124	6,595	433	1,026	12,625	13.61%	1	0	1
Left Party – Communists	VPK	265	212	304	464	311	1,940	199	587	4,282	4.62%	0	0	0
Liberal People's Party	FP	368	176	172	312	315	1,840	140	320	3,643	3.93%	0	0	0
Green Party	MP	111	81	69	97	143	697	120	179	1,497	1.61%	0	0	0
Christian Democratic Unity	KDS	139	90	62	95	200	583	66	196	1,431	1.54%	0	0	0
K-Party	K-P	0	0	0	0	0	0	0	0	0	0.00%	0	0	0
Other parties		6	2	1	6	6	39	5	14	79	0.09%	0	0	0
Valid votes		6,541	6,150	6,418	8,828	9,056	38,279	5,337	12,149	92,758	100.00%	5	0	5
Rejected votes		55	22	22	64	35	307	33	71	609	0.65%			
Total polled		6,596	6,172	6,440	8,892	9,091	38,586	5,370	12,220	93,367	90.00%			
Registered electors		7,373	7,020	7,043	10,185	10,066	42,637	5,860	13,555	103,739				
Turnout		89.46%	87.92%	91.44%	87.30%	90.31%	90.50%	91.64%	90.15%	90.00%				

The following candidates were elected: Nils G. Åsling (C); Nils-Olof Gustafsson (S); Ingrid Hemmingsson (M); Marianne Stålberg (S); and Margareta Winberg (S).

==== 1970s ====
===== 1979 =====
Results of the 1979 general election held on 16 September 1979:

Party		Votes per municipality								Total votes	%	Seats		
Party		Åre	Berg	Bräcke	Härje- dalen	Kro- kom	Öster- sund	Rag- unda	Ström- sund	Total votes	%	Con.	Lev.	Tot.
Swedish Social Democratic Party	S	2,717	2,529	3,765	5,125	4,186	17,571	3,055	6,950	45,898	50.41%	3	0	3
Centre Party	C	1,990	2,344	1,507	1,930	2,832	8,744	1,423	3,058	23,828	26.17%	2	0	2
Moderate Party	M	762	598	514	710	857	5,125	378	865	9,809	10.77%	0	0	0
Liberal People's Party	FP	507	266	261	456	527	2,964	212	495	5,688	6.25%	0	0	0
Left Party – Communists	VPK	210	236	263	464	290	1,870	218	516	4,067	4.47%	0	0	0
Christian Democratic Unity	KDS	113	80	45	85	164	501	63	180	1,231	1.35%	0	0	0
Communist Party of Sweden	SKP	6	5	2	14	3	77	2	24	133	0.15%	0	0	0
Workers' Party – The Communists	APK	1	1	9	0	0	28	3	27	69	0.08%	0	0	0
Other parties		29	19	7	15	72	135	20	28	325	0.36%	0	0	0
Valid votes		6,335	6,078	6,373	8,799	8,931	37,015	5,374	12,143	91,048	100.00%	5	0	5
Rejected votes		24	16	30	32	34	223	21	48	428	0.47%			
Total polled		6,359	6,094	6,403	8,831	8,965	37,238	5,395	12,191	91,476	89.04%			
Registered electors		7,130	7,019	7,059	10,202	10,013	41,754	5,957	13,597	102,731				
Turnout		89.19%	86.82%	90.71%	86.56%	89.53%	89.18%	90.57%	89.66%	89.04%				

The following candidates were elected: Nils G. Åsling (C); Stina Eliasson (C); Nils-Olof Gustafsson (S); Sven Lindberg (S); and Marianne Stålberg (S).

Permanent substitutions:

- Sven Lindberg (S) resigned in October 1981 and was replaced by Margareta Winberg (S) on 5 October 1981.

===== 1976 =====
Results of the 1976 general election held on 19 September 1976:

Party		Votes per municipality								Total votes	%	Seats		
Party		Åre	Berg	Bräcke	Härje- dalen	Kro- kom	Öster- sund	Rag- unda	Ström- sund	Total votes	%	Con.	Lev.	Tot.
Swedish Social Democratic Party	S	2,667	2,382	3,694	4,957	4,011	16,352	3,015	6,772	43,850	47.94%	3	0	3
Centre Party	C	2,245	2,572	1,927	2,300	3,234	11,308	1,662	3,704	28,952	31.65%	2	0	2
Moderate Party	M	598	449	367	489	650	3,793	284	605	7,235	7.91%	0	0	0
People's Party	F	581	347	295	496	585	3,358	217	516	6,395	6.99%	0	0	0
Left Party – Communists	VPK	162	193	277	400	222	1,435	203	593	3,485	3.81%	0	0	0
Christian Democratic Unity	KDS	143	75	41	97	163	471	77	165	1,232	1.35%	0	0	0
Communist Party of Sweden	SKP	13	7	10	27	22	172	6	46	303	0.33%	0	0	0
Other parties		3	2	1	2	3	10	0	1	22	0.02%	0	0	0
Valid votes		6,412	6,027	6,612	8,768	8,890	36,899	5,464	12,402	91,474	100.00%	5	0	5
Rejected votes		14	11	18	17	23	126	15	21	245	0.27%			
Total polled		6,426	6,038	6,630	8,785	8,913	37,025	5,479	12,423	91,719	90.42%			
Registered electors		7,065	6,898	7,181	10,062	9,858	40,800	5,951	13,627	101,442				
Turnout		90.96%	87.53%	92.33%	87.31%	90.41%	90.75%	92.07%	91.16%	90.42%				

The following candidates were elected: Nils G. Åsling (C); Sven Lindberg (S); Birger Nilsson (S); Per Stjernström (C); and Marianne Stålberg (S).

===== 1973 =====
Results of the 1973 general election held on 16 September 1973:

Party		Votes per municipality								Total votes	%	Seats		
Party		Åre	Berg	Bräcke	Härje- dalen	Kro- kom	Öster- sund	Rag- unda	Ström- sund	Total votes	%	Con.	Lev.	Tot.
Swedish Social Democratic Party	S	2,586	2,326	3,720	4,610	3,808	14,980	3,034	6,727	41,791	48.16%	3	0	3
Centre Party	C	2,015	2,436	1,785	2,096	2,958	10,142	1,516	3,441	26,389	30.41%	2	0	2
Moderate Party	M	538	472	415	446	649	3,444	384	623	6,971	8.03%	0	0	0
People's Party	F	703	409	302	507	651	2,967	217	580	6,336	7.30%	0	0	0
Left Party – Communists	VPK	189	213	292	509	261	1,236	247	662	3,609	4.16%	0	0	0
Christian Democratic Unity	KDS	122	92	56	93	205	454	66	179	1,267	1.46%	0	0	0
Communist Party of Sweden	SKP	10	24	10	32	13	150	3	62	304	0.35%	0	0	0
Communist League Marxist–Leninists (the revolutionaries)	KFML(r)	1	6	2	5	14	59	1	8	96	0.11%	0	0	0
Other parties		0	0	0	0	0	7	0	4	11	0.01%	0	0	0
Valid votes		6,164	5,978	6,582	8,298	8,559	33,439	5,468	12,286	86,774	100.00%	5	0	5
Rejected votes		9	7	5	22	6	48	8	9	114	0.13%			
Total polled		6,173	5,985	6,587	8,320	8,565	33,487	5,476	12,295	86,888	89.51%			
Registered electors		6,814	6,863	7,150	9,694	9,633	37,397	5,980	13,538	97,069				
Turnout		90.59%	87.21%	92.13%	85.83%	88.91%	89.54%	91.57%	90.82%	89.51%				

The following candidates were elected: Nils G. Åsling (C); Sven Lindberg (S); Birger Nilsson (S); Per Stjernström (C); and Valfrid Wikner (S).

===== 1970 =====
Results of the 1970 general election held on 20 September 1970:

Party		Votes per municipality																										Total votes	%	Seats		
Party		Alsen	Åre	Berg	Bräcke	Fors	Föl- linge	Frost- viken	Hag- dal	Hallen	Hammer- dal	Hede	Käl- arne	Kali	Lillhär- dal	Mörsil	Offer- dal	Öster- sund	Rag- unda	Rev- sund	Rodon	Ström	Stugun	Sveg	Tännäs	Under- soker	Postal votes	Total votes	%	Con.	Lev.	Tot.
Swedish Social Democratic Party	S	368	573	2,198	1,072	714	750	686	686	217	1,125	848	992	261	447	573	670	12,135	1,251	1,319	1,598	2,468	864	1,609	537	754	5,280	39,995	49.80%	3	0	3
Centre Party	C	221	232	1,997	320	301	491	166	233	372	722	375	368	183	89	278	621	6,122	570	628	891	730	293	481	206	350	2,509	19,749	24.59%	2	0	2
People's Party	F	77	280	514	96	84	211	57	66	105	214	134	86	58	76	162	192	3,371	108	181	318	338	32	198	119	169	1,953	9,199	11.45%	0	0	0
Moderate Party	M	90	104	501	109	66	126	31	70	73	146	41	114	40	11	89	158	2,420	127	155	264	210	153	112	81	129	1,639	7,059	8.79%	0	0	0
Left Party – Communists	VPK	33	28	164	75	51	34	22	98	8	44	90	91	10	29	42	10	737	69	79	128	100	70	187	24	30	330	2,583	3.22%	0	0	0
Christian Democratic Unity	KDS	19	32	100	7	7	90	11	10	21	46	12	14	5	12	11	50	409	42	11	45	39	5	46	5	25	289	1,363	1.70%	0	0	0
Communist League Marxists-Leninists	KFML	4	5	23	2	1	3	6	12	4	8	3	3	0	2	3	4	89	4	6	9	26	8	12	1	1	125	364	0.45%	0	0	0
Other parties		0	0	0	0	0	0	0	0	0	0	0	0	0	0	0	0	0	0	0	0	0	0	0	0	0	7	7	0.01%	0	0	0
Valid votes		812	1,254	5,497	1,681	1,224	1,705	979	1,175	800	2,305	1,503	1,668	557	666	1,158	1,705	25,283	2,171	2,379	3,253	3,911	1,425	2,645	973	1,458	12,132	80,319	100.00%	5	0	5
Rejected votes		3	0	4	3	1	2	0	0	1	1	1	0	1	0	5	0	20	0	3	2	2	0	0	0	0	28	77	0.10%			
Total polled exc. postal votes		815	1,254	5,501	1,684	1,225	1,707	979	1,175	801	2,306	1,504	1,668	558	666	1,163	1,705	25,303	2,171	2,382	3,255	3,913	1,425	2,645	973	1,458	12,160	80,396				
Postal votes		68	264	528	380	300	260	194	91	83	280	136	226	60	69	253	163	5,736	308	343	483	643	226	403	280	377	-12,160	-6				
Total polled inc. postal votes		883	1,518	6,029	2,064	1,525	1,967	1,173	1,266	884	2,586	1,640	1,894	618	735	1,416	1,868	31,039	2,479	2,725	3,738	4,556	1,651	3,048	1,253	1,835	0	80,390	86.82%			
Registered electors		1,033	1,741	7,196	2,298	1,762	2,299	1,369	1,557	1,068	2,856	2,022	2,080	757	894	1,586	2,206	35,595	2,761	3,048	4,328	5,120	1,800	3,642	1,516	2,063		92,597				
Turnout		85.48%	87.19%	83.78%	89.82%	86.55%	85.56%	85.68%	81.31%	82.77%	90.55%	81.11%	91.06%	81.64%	82.21%	89.28%	84.68%	87.20%	89.79%	89.40%	86.37%	88.98%	91.72%	83.69%	82.65%	88.95%		86.82%				

The following candidates were elected: Nils G. Åsling (C); Sven Lindberg (S); Birger Nilsson (S); Per Stjernström (C); and Valfrid Wikner (S).
