= Rune Berglund =

Swedish politician (born 1939)

Member of the Riksdag
- In office 3 October 1994 – 2 October 2006
- Constituency: Jämtland County
- In office 11 January 1991 – 30 September 1991
- Preceded by: Bo Toresson
- Constituency: Jämtland County

Personal details
- Born: 1939 (age 86–87)
- Party: Social Democratic Party

Rune Berglund (born 1939) is a Swedish politician and former member of the Riksdag, the national legislature. A member of the Social Democratic Party, he represented Jämtland County between January 1991 and September 1991, and between October 1994 and October 2006.
