= Results of the 1979 Swedish general election =

Results of a Swedish general election

General elections were held in Sweden on 16 September 1979. The centre-right alliance won the election with a margin of 8,404 votes.

== National results ==
Party	Votes	%	Seats			
Party	Votes	%	Con.	Lev.	Tot.	+/–
Swedish Social Democratic Party	2,356,234	43.24	142	12	154	+2
Moderate Party	1,108,406	20.34	65	8	73	+18
Centre Party	984,589	18.07	60	4	64	–22
People's Party	577,063	10.59	32	6	38	–1
Left Party Communists	305,420	5.61	11	9	20	+3
Christian Democratic Unity	75,993	1.39	0	0	0	0
Communist Party	10,862	0.20	0	0	0	0
Workers Party Communists	10,725	0.20	0	0	0	New
Other parties	19,346	0.36	0	0	0	0
Total	5,448,638	100.00	310	39	349	0
Valid votes	5,448,638	99.43				
Invalid/blank votes	31,488	0.57				
Total votes	5,480,126	100.00				
Registered voters/turnout	6,040,461	90.72				
Source: Nohlen & Stöver

== Results by region ==
=== Percentage share ===
Location	Turnout	Share	Votes	S	M	C	FP	VPK	KDS	Other	Left	Right
Götaland	91.0	48.2	2,624,933	40.8	22.0	19.4	11.4	4.3	1.5	0.7	45.1	52.7
Svealand	90.5	37.0	2,013,827	43.2	22.1	15.3	10.7	6.9	1.1	0.8	50.0	48.1
Norrland	90.5	14.9	809,878	51.3	10.6	20.5	7.9	6.7	2.0	1.0	58.0	39.0
Total	90.7	100.0	5,448,638	43.2	20.3	18.1	10.6	5.6	1.4	0.8	48.8	49.0
Source: SCB

=== By votes ===
Location	Turnout	Share	Votes	S	M	C	FP	VPK	KDS	Other	Left	Right
Götaland	91.0	48.2	2,624,933	1,071,141	576,564	509,876	298,140	113,370	38,730	17,112	1,184,511	1,384,580
Svealand	90.5	37.0	2,013,827	869,528	445,681	308,610	215,017	138,125	21,258	15,608	1,007,653	969,308
Norrland	90.5	14.9	809,878	415,565	86,161	166,103	63,906	53,925	16,005	8,213	469,490	316,170
Total	90.7	100.0	5,448,638	2,356,234	1,108,406	984,589	577,063	305,420	75,993	40,933	2,661,654	2,670,058
Source: SCB

== Results by constituencies ==
=== Percentage share ===
Location	Land	Turnout	Share	Votes	S	M	C	FP	VPK	KDS	Other	Left	Right	Margin
Location		%	%		%	%	%	%	%	%	%	%	%	
Blekinge	G	91.2	1.9	103,037	49.9	16.6	16.5	11.3	3.9	1.4	0.3	53.8	44.4	9,727
Bohuslän	G	90.7	3.3	179,085	37.7	21.3	19.8	15.2	4.3	1.2	0.5	42.0	56.3	25,526
Gothenburg	G	88.7	5.2	282,944	37.6	24.7	9.6	16.2	9.9	0.9	1.2	47.5	50.4	8,429
Gotland	G	90.0	0.7	36,585	38.7	16.1	31.3	8.7	4.2	0.6	0.3	42.9	56.1	4,820
Gävleborg	N	89.8	3.6	198,508	52.2	10.7	20.4	7.9	6.7	1.4	0.6	59.0	39.1	39,517
Halland	G	91.8	2.8	150,322	35.8	22.2	27.6	10.3	3.0	0.8	0.3	38.8	60.1	32,060
Jämtland	N	89.0	1.7	91,048	50.4	10.8	26.2	6.2	4.5	1.4	0.6	54.9	43.2	10,640
Jönköping	G	92.1	3.7	201,877	37.4	19.6	23.9	11.3	3.2	4.2	0.3	40.6	54.9	28,824
Kalmar	G	91.3	3.0	164,457	44.1	18.6	24.0	7.1	4.0	1.9	0.3	48.1	49.8	2,763
Kopparberg	S	89.7	3.5	189,904	47.6	13.7	24.0	7.4	5.1	1.5	0.6	52.8	45.1	14,628
Kristianstad	G	90.5	3.4	184,372	39.5	23.6	21.7	10.9	2.2	1.3	0.8	41.7	56.2	26,785
Kronoberg	G	91.0	2.1	113,467	38.1	20.6	27.2	8.1	4.2	1.4	0.4	42.3	55.9	15,375
Fyrstadskretsen	G	90.6	5.6	304,737	45.2	27.8	8.9	11.8	4.6	0.5	1.1	49.9	48.5	4,172
Malmöhus	G	92.5	3.5	188,787	41.7	25.0	19.3	11.2	1.7	0.5	0.4	43.5	55.5	22,785
Norrbotten	N	90.3	3.2	172,587	55.4	10.3	13.8	5.9	10.3	2.0	2.4	65.6	30.0	61,537
Skaraborg	G	90.8	3.3	177,196	36.3	20.2	26.4	10.3	3.4	2.4	1.0	39.7	56.9	30,579
Stockholm	S	89.0	8.3	453,287	37.8	29.2	9.0	11.7	10.5	0.8	1.0	48.3	49.9	7,174
Stockholm County	S	91.2	9.4	510,210	37.8	28.3	13.2	12.0	7.2	0.8	0.7	45.0	53.5	43,035
Södermanland	S	91.9	3.0	163,741	50.9	16.3	16.4	10.7	3.9	1.3	0.5	54.8	43.3	18,778
Uppsala	S	90.7	2.8	153,866	42.3	18.8	19.9	10.7	6.6	1.1	0.6	48.9	49.3	583
Värmland	S	91.2	3.6	195,704	47.7	17.2	20.2	8.6	4.9	0.8	0.6	52.5	46.1	12,609
Västerbotten	N	90.4	3.0	161,941	46.5	10.7	21.0	12.5	5.4	3.3	0.6	51.9	44.2	12,434
Västernorrland	N	92.0	3.4	185,794	51.2	10.8	23.6	6.5	5.4	1.8	0.7	56.6	40.9	29,192
Västmanland	S	90.7	3.0	164,056	50.5	16.1	15.5	10.7	5.1	1.1	1.0	55.6	42.3	21,793
Älvsborg N	G	91.5	2.9	158,073	40.2	18.5	23.4	12.2	4.0	1.5	0.2	44.2	54.1	15,671
Älvsborg S	G	92.5	2.2	118,834	40.0	22.2	22.4	9.9	3.7	1.4	0.3	43.7	54.6	12,979
Örebro	S	90.7	3.4	183,059	49.2	14.9	17.9	10.0	5.3	2.0	0.8	54.4	42.8	21,329
Östergötland	G	91.2	4.8	261,160	46.6	19.8	17.2	9.4	4.5	1.9	0.7	51.1	46.3	12,628
Total		90.7	100.0	5,448,638	43.2	20.3	18.1	10.6	5.6	1.4	0.8	48.8	49.0	8,404
Source: SCB

=== By votes ===
Location	Land	Turnout	Share	Votes	S	M	C	FP	VPK	KDS	Other	Left	Right	Margin
Location		%	%											
Blekinge	G	91.2	1.9	103,037	51,443	17,134	16,967	11,638	4,023	1,448	384	55,466	45,739	9,727
Bohuslän	G	90.7	3.3	179,085	67,460	38,160	35,395	27,196	7,765	2,137	972	75,225	100,751	25,526
Gothenburg	G	88.7	5.2	282,944	106,274	69,904	27,022	45,800	28,023	2,454	3,467	134,297	142,726	8,429
Gotland	G	90.0	0.7	36,585	14,175	5,908	11,445	3,177	1,535	235	110	15,710	20,530	4,820
Gävleborg	N	89.8	3.6	198,508	103,713	21,311	40,546	15,683	13,344	2,712	1,199	117,057	77,540	39,517
Halland	G	91.8	2.8	150,322	53,792	33,385	41,436	15,521	4,490	1,229	469	58,282	90,342	32,060
Jämtland	N	89.0	1.7	91,048	45,898	9,809	23,828	5,688	4,067	1,231	527	49,965	39,325	10,640
Jönköping	G	92.1	3.7	201,877	75,507	39,610	48,343	22,813	6,435	8,478	691	81,942	110,766	28,824
Kalmar	G	91.3	3.0	164,457	72,549	30,650	39,438	11,737	6,513	3,069	501	79,062	81,825	2,763
Kopparberg	S	89.7	3.5	189,904	90,475	25,986	45,537	14,075	9,751	2,896	1,184	100,226	85,598	14,628
Kristianstad	G	90.5	3.4	184,372	72,836	43,462	40,065	20,149	4,055	2,380	1,425	76,891	103,676	26,785
Kronoberg	G	91.0	2.1	113,467	43,285	23,418	30,827	9,172	4,757	1,565	443	48,042	63,417	15,375
Malmö area	G	90.6	5.6	304,737	137,848	84,573	27,240	35,965	14,102	1,492	3,517	151,950	147,778	4,172
Malmöhus	G	92.5	3.5	188,787	78,796	47,270	36,471	21,121	3,281	1,017	831	82,077	104,862	22,785
Norrbotten	N	90.3	3.2	172,587	95,565	17,768	23,762	10,211	17,713	3,443	4,125	113,278	51,741	61,537
Skaraborg	G	90.8	3.3	177,196	64,305	35,825	46,788	18,284	6,013	4,228	1,753	70,318	100,897	30,579
Stockholm	S	89.0	8.3	453,287	171,474	132,224	40,676	53,261	47,513	3,483	4,656	218,987	226,161	7,174
Stockholm County	S	91.2	9.4	510,210	192,980	144,543	67,185	61,030	36,743	4,111	3,618	229,723	272,758	43,035
Södermanland	S	91.9	3.0	163,741	83,340	26,616	26,867	17,478	6,399	2,153	888	89,739	70,961	18,778
Uppsala	S	90.7	2.8	153,866	65,153	28,863	30,614	16,415	10,156	1,756	909	75,309	75,892	583
Värmland	S	91.2	3.6	195,704	93,306	33,749	39,607	16,848	9,507	1,477	1,210	102,813	90,204	12,609
Västerbotten	N	90.4	3.0	161,941	75,233	17,279	34,075	20,204	8,759	5,357	1,034	83,992	71,558	12,434
Västernorrland	N	92.0	3.4	185,794	95,156	19,994	43,892	12,120	10,042	3,262	1,328	105,198	76,006	29,192
Västmanland	S	90.7	3.0	164,056	82,811	26,401	25,406	17,622	8,411	1,741	1,664	91,222	69,429	21,793
Älvsborg N	G	91.5	2.9	158,073	63,481	29,218	36,952	19,338	6,356	2,393	335	69,837	85,508	15,671
Älvsborg S	G	92.5	2.2	118,834	47,560	26,419	26,672	11,792	4,344	1,719	328	51,904	64,883	12,979
Örebro	S	90.7	3.4	183,059	89,989	27,299	32,718	18,288	9,645	3,641	1,479	99,634	78,305	21,329
Östergötland	G	91.2	4.8	261,160	121,830	51,628	44,815	24,437	11,678	4,886	1,886	133,508	120,880	12,628
Total		90.7	100.0	5,448,638	2,356,234	1,108,406	984,589	577,063	305,420	75,993	40,933	2,661,654	2,670,058	8,404
Source: SCB

== 1976–1979 bloc comparison ==
=== Percentage share ===
Constituency	Land	Votes 1976	Left 1976	Right 1976	Win 1976	Votes 1979	Left 1979	Right 1979	Win 1979	Change
Constituency			%	%	%		%	%	%	%
Blekinge	G	103,248	52.84	45.09	7.75	103,037	53.83	44.39	11.44	3.69
Bohuslän	G	175,069	41.29	57.55	16.26	179,085	42.01	56.26	14.25	2.01
Gothenburg	G	290,365	46.97	51.51	4.54	282,944	47.46	50.44	2.98	1.56
Gotland	G	36,105	40.23	59.02	18.79	36,585	42.94	56.12	13.18	5.61
Gävleborg	N	198,949	57.17	41.21	15.96	198,508	58.97	39.06	19.91	3.95
Halland	G	146,371	37.72	61.35	23.63	150,322	38.77	60.10	21.33	2.30
Jämtland	N	91,474	51.75	46.55	5.20	91,048	54.88	43.19	11.69	6.49
Jönköping	G	202,653	38.92	57.23	18.31	201,877	40.59	54.87	14.28	4.03
Kalmar	G	164,975	46.58	51.38	4.80	164,457	48.07	49.75	1.68	3.12
Kopparberg	S	189,286	50.56	47.67	2.89	189,904	52.78	45.07	7.71	4.82
Kristianstad	G	182,955	40.93	57.41	16.48	184,372	41.70	56.23	14.53	1.95
Kronoberg	G	113,411	41.13	57.18	16.05	113,467	42.34	55.89	13.55	2.50
Malmö area	G	309,027	49.66	49.35	0.31	304,737	49.86	48.49	1.37	1.06
Malmöhus	G	184,759	43.54	55.74	12.20	188,787	43.48	55.55	12.07	0.13
Norrbotten	N	169,641	64.94	32.41	32.53	172,587	65.64	29.98	35.66	3.13
Skaraborg	G	175,734	37.30	60.36	23.06	177,196	39.68	56.94	17.26	5.80
Stockholm	S	471,070	46.97	51.37	4.40	453,287	48.31	49.89	1.58	2.82
Stockholm County	S	495,207	43.53	55.18	11.65	510,210	45.03	53.46	8.43	3.22
Södermanland	S	163,147	52.86	45.43	7.43	163,741	54.81	43.34	11.47	4.04
Uppsala	S	149,325	47.58	50.63	3.05	153,866	48.94	49.32	0.38	2.67
Värmland	S	196,183	50.13	48.85	1.28	195,704	52.53	46.09	6.44	5.16
Västerbotten	N	159,435	49.34	46.83	2.51	161,941	51.87	44.19	7.68	5.17
Västernorrland	N	186,498	55.39	42.52	12.87	185,794	56.62	40.91	15.71	2.84
Västmanland	S	163,608	54.62	43.77	10.85	164,056	55.60	42.32	13.28	2.43
Älvsborg N	G	155,343	42.27	56.18	13.91	158,073	44.18	54.09	9.91	4.00
Älvsborg S	G	118,587	41.84	56.81	14.97	118,834	43.68	54.60	10.92	4.05
Örebro	S	184,721	53.00	44.82	8.18	183,059	54.43	42.78	11.65	3.47
Östergötland	G	260,602	49.69	48.00	1.69	261,160	51.89	46.29	5.60	3.91
Total		5,437,748	47.50	50.74	3.24	5,448,638	48.85	49.00	0.15	3.09
Source: SCB

=== By votes ===
Constituency	Land	Votes 1976	Left 1976	Right 1976	Win 1976	Votes 1979	Left 1979	Right 1979	Win 1979	Change
Constituency	#									
Blekinge	G	103,248	54,557	46,550	8,007	103,037	55,466	45,739	9,727	1,720
Bohuslän	G	175,069	72,282	100,758	28,476	179,085	75,225	100,751	25,526	2,950
Gothenburg	G	290,365	136,398	149,581	13,183	282,944	134,297	142,726	8,429	4,754
Gotland	G	36,105	14,525	21,309	6,784	36,585	15,710	20,530	4,820	1,964
Gävleborg	N	198,949	113,749	81,983	31,766	198,508	117,057	77,540	39,517	7,751
Halland	G	146,371	55,210	89,802	34,592	150,322	58,282	90,342	32,060	2,532
Jämtland	N	91,474	47,335	42,582	4,753	91,048	49,965	39,325	10,640	5,887
Jönköping	G	202,653	78,882	115,979	37,097	201,877	81,942	110,766	28,824	8,273
Kalmar	G	164,975	76,840	84,762	7,922	164,457	79,062	81,825	2,763	5,159
Kopparberg	S	189,286	95,707	90,234	5,473	189,904	100,226	85,598	14,628	9,155
Kristianstad	G	182,955	74,890	105,043	30,153	184,372	76,891	103,676	26,785	3,368
Kronoberg	G	113,411	46,650	64,843	18,193	113,467	48,042	63,417	15,375	2,818
Malmö area	G	309,027	153,459	152,498	961	304,737	151,950	147,778	4,172	3,211
Malmöhus	G	184,759	80,435	102,988	22,553	188,787	82,077	104,862	22,785	232
Norrbotten	N	169,641	110,157	54,981	55,176	172,587	113,278	51,741	61,537	6,361
Skaraborg	G	175,734	65,542	106,079	40,537	177,196	70,318	100,897	30,579	9,958
Stockholm	S	471,070	221,252	242,010	20,758	453,287	218,987	226,161	7,174	13,584
Stockholm County	S	495,207	215,561	273,271	57,710	510,210	229,723	272,758	43,035	14,675
Södermanland	S	163,147	86,236	74,110	12,126	163,741	89,739	70,961	18,778	6,652
Uppsala	S	149,325	71,054	75,606	4,552	153,866	75,309	75,892	583	3,969
Värmland	S	196,183	98,346	95,834	2,512	195,704	102,813	90,204	12,609	10,097
Västerbotten	N	159,435	78,666	74,660	4,006	161,941	83,992	71,558	12,434	8,428
Västernorrland	N	186,498	103,294	79,295	23,999	185,794	105,198	76,006	29,192	5,193
Västmanland	S	163,608	89,355	71,608	17,747	164,056	91,222	69,429	21,793	4,046
Älvsborg N	G	155,343	65,656	87,273	21,617	158,073	69,837	85,508	15,671	5,946
Älvsborg S	G	118,587	49,618	67,375	17,757	118,834	51,904	64,883	12,979	4,778
Örebro	S	184,721	97,898	82,792	15,106	183,059	99,634	78,305	21,329	6,223
Östergötland	G	260,602	129,481	125,091	4,390	261,160	133,508	120,880	12,628	8,238
Total		5,437,748	2,583,035	2,758,897	175,862	5,448,638	2,661,654	2,670,058	8,404	167,458
Source: SCB

== Results by municipalities ==
Votes by municipality. The municipalities are the color of the party that got the most votes within the coalition that won relative majority.

Cartogram of the map to the left with each municipality rescaled to the number of valid votes cast.

Map showing the voting shifts from the 1976 to the 1979 election. Darker blue indicates a municipality voted more towards the parties that formed the centre-right bloc. Darker red indicates a municipality voted more towards the parties that form the left-wing bloc.

Votes by municipality as a scale from red/Left-wing bloc to blue/Centre-right bloc.

Cartogram of vote with each municipality rescaled in proportion to number of valid votes cast. Deeper blue represents a relative majority for the centre-right coalition, brighter red represents a relative majority for the left-wing coalition.

=== Blekinge ===
Location	Turnout	Share	Votes	S	M	C	FP	VPK	KDS	Other	L-vote	R-vote	Left	Right	Margin
Location		%			%	%	%	%	%	%			%	%	
Karlshamn	90.4	20.6	21,228	51.8	15.3	15.1	10.4	5.5	1.5	0.4	12,172	8,662	57.3	40.8	3,510
Karlskrona	91.3	40.4	41,602	47.8	17.9	15.6	13.3	3.4	1.6	0.3	21,313	19,489	51.2	46.8	1,824
Olofström	91.6	9.2	9,493	53.3	13.0	16.6	10.1	4.3	2.0	0.6	5,470	3,765	57.6	39.7	1,705
Ronneby	91.5	19.5	20,064	51.6	14.9	20.2	9.0	3.4	0.6	0.4	11,035	8,833	55.0	44.0	2,202
Sölvesborg	91.4	10.3	10,650	48.3	20.8	15.4	10.7	3.1	1.5	0.2	5,476	4,990	51.4	46.9	486
Total	91.2	1.9	103,037	49.9	16.6	16.5	11.3	3.9	1.4	0.3	55,466	45,739	53.8	44.4	9,727
Source: SCB

=== Dalarna ===
Kopparberg County

Location	Turnout	Share	Votes	S	M	C	FP	VPK	KDS	Other	L-vote	R-vote	Left	Right	Margin
Location		%			%	%	%	%	%	%			%	%	
Avesta	91.8	9.5	17,989	57.0	9.4	19.5	6.2	5.7	1.7	0.6	11,273	6,312	62.7	35.1	4,961
Borlänge	90.2	15.8	30,045	54.2	12.3	18.4	7.5	5.5	1.3	0.9	17,932	11,477	59.7	38.2	6,455
Falun	89.1	17.4	33,105	38.7	20.0	24.4	10.3	4.9	1.2	0.5	14,426	18,103	43.6	54.7	3,677
Gagnef	90.7	3.3	6,325	43.1	11.6	32.3	6.6	3.6	2.4	0.3	2,952	3,198	46.7	50.6	246
Hedemora	90.5	5.9	11,260	49.8	12.6	24.1	6.9	4.4	1.6	0.7	6,095	4,900	54.1	43.5	1,195
Leksand	89.7	4.8	9,202	35.6	18.5	30.9	8.9	2.5	2.9	0.6	3,508	5,372	38.1	58.4	1,864
Ludvika	90.1	11.4	21,727	59.1	10.9	13.2	6.3	8.7	1.1	0.8	14,717	6,616	67.7	30.5	8,101
Malung	91.4	4.4	8,334	47.7	12.2	27.1	7.3	4.3	1.1	0.4	4,333	3,880	52.0	46.6	453
Mora	87.8	6.6	12,439	39.5	15.1	33.9	6.3	3.8	1.1	0.4	5,377	6,873	43.2	55.3	1,496
Orsa	85.6	2.5	4,759	40.4	15.5	29.0	6.9	5.4	1.9	0.9	2,182	2,440	45.8	51.3	258
Rättvik	85.1	3.9	7,312	36.0	17.0	33.0	7.9	4.0	1.6	0.6	2,922	4,235	40.0	57.9	1,313
Smedjebacken	92.9	4.7	8,856	61.3	9.1	16.4	6.0	5.2	1.1	0.8	5,890	2,793	66.5	31.5	3,097
Säter	90.4	3.7	7,007	41.0	12.9	33.3	6.0	4.2	2.2	0.4	3,167	3,653	45.2	52.1	486
Vansbro	91.0	3.1	5,956	44.1	11.1	30.8	5.2	5.0	3.5	0.4	2,921	2,803	49.0	47.1	118
Älvdalen	85.7	2.9	5,588	41.8	9.0	36.8	6.9	3.5	1.7	0.4	2,531	2,943	45.3	52.7	412
Total	89.7	3.5	189,904	47.6	13.7	24.0	7.4	5.1	1.5	0.6	100,226	85,598	52.8	45.1	14,628
Source: SCB

=== Gotland ===
Location	Turnout	Share	Votes	S	M	C	FP	VPK	KDS	Other	L-vote	R-vote	Left	Right	Margin
Location		%			%	%	%	%	%	%			%	%	
Gotland	90.0	100.0	36,585	38.7	16.1	31.3	8.7	4.2	0.6	0.3	15,710	20,530	42.9	56.1	4,820
Total	90.0	0.7	36,585	38.7	16.1	31.3	8.7	4.2	0.6	0.3	15,710	20,530	42.9	56.1	4,820
Source: SCB

=== Gävleborg ===
Location	Turnout	Share	Votes	S	M	C	FP	VPK	KDS	Other	L-vote	R-vote	Left	Right	Margin
Location		%			%	%	%	%	%	%			%	%	
Bollnäs	88.6	9.4	18,705	46.4	9.6	25.6	8.5	7.4	1.7	0.6	10,063	8,195	53.8	43.8	1,868
Gävle	89.7	29.6	58,694	54.0	14.6	13.4	10.4	5.8	1.1	0.5	35,122	22,558	59.8	38.4	12,564
Hofors	91.0	4.6	9,037	64.5	7.0	11.8	5.7	9.8	0.5	0.7	6,709	2,213	74.2	24.5	4,496
Hudiksvall	88.6	12.5	24,840	44.8	9.6	30.0	5.8	7.7	1.4	0.7	13,035	11,284	52.5	45.4	1,751
Ljusdal	86.0	7.3	14,489	46.5	9.1	26.7	6.9	8.9	1.5	0.4	8,018	6,187	55.3	42.7	1,831
Nordanstig	89.4	4.0	7,996	42.2	6.4	35.2	6.2	6.8	3.1	0.2	3,912	3,820	48.9	47.8	92
Ockelbo	90.2	2.3	4,608	52.3	7.4	29.9	4.9	4.3	0.8	0.4	2,608	1,942	56.6	42.1	666
Ovanåker	92.1	4.8	9,455	42.4	9.0	33.1	9.2	2.7	3.3	0.3	4,262	4,850	45.1	51.3	588
Sandviken	91.5	14.6	29,017	58.8	10.7	15.4	7.4	6.1	1.1	0.5	18,837	9,713	64.9	33.5	9,124
Söderhamn	91.2	10.9	21,667	59.1	8.4	17.1	5.9	7.8	1.0	0.9	14,491	6,778	66.9	31.3	7,713
Total	89.8	3.6	198,508	52.2	10.7	20.4	7.9	6.7	1.4	0.6	117,057	77,540	59.0	39.1	39,517
Source: SCB

=== Halland ===
Location	Turnout	Share	Votes	S	M	C	FP	VPK	KDS	Other	L-vote	R-vote	Left	Right	Margin
Location		%			%	%	%	%	%	%			%	%	
Falkenberg	92.4	15.4	23,188	35.2	18.7	35.0	8.2	2.1	0.8	0.1	8,644	14,335	37.3	61.8	5,691
Halmstad	91.3	33.3	49,984	42.5	22.5	18.7	10.9	4.0	1.0	0.4	23,246	26,047	46.5	52.1	2,801
Hylte	92.4	4.9	7,409	37.4	15.6	36.4	8.1	1.5	0.8	0.3	2,883	4,451	38.9	60.1	1,568
Kungsbacka	92.5	17.7	26,646	26.5	31.6	24.1	14.2	2.9	0.6	0.2	7,826	18,611	29.4	69.8	10,785
Laholm	91.5	9.4	14,103	27.9	20.2	41.5	7.7	1.9	0.5	0.2	4,215	9,788	29.9	69.4	5,573
Varberg	91.5	19.3	28,992	36.6	18.6	31.1	9.3	3.0	1.0	0.4	11,468	17,110	39.6	59.0	5,642
Total	91.8	2.8	150,322	35.8	22.2	27.6	10.3	3.0	0.8	0.3	58,282	90,342	38.8	60.1	32,060
Source: SCB

=== Jämtland ===
Location	Turnout	Share	Votes	S	M	C	FP	VPK	KDS	Other	L-vote	R-vote	Left	Right	Margin
Location		%			%	%	%	%	%	%			%	%	
Berg	86.8	6.7	6,078	41.6	9.8	38.6	4.4	3.9	1.3	0.4	2,765	3,208	45.5	52.8	443
Bräcke	90.7	7.0	6,373	59.1	8.1	23.6	4.1	4.1	0.7	0.2	4,028	2,282	63.2	35.8	1,746
Härjedalen	86.6	9.7	8,799	58.2	8.1	21.9	5.2	5.3	1.0	0.4	5,589	3,096	63.5	35.2	2,493
Krokom	89.5	9.8	8,931	46.9	9.6	31.7	5.9	3.2	1.8	0.8	4,476	4,216	50.1	47.2	260
Ragunda	90.6	5.9	5,374	56.8	7.0	26.5	3.9	4.1	1.2	0.5	3,273	2,013	60.9	37.5	1,260
Strömsund	89.7	13.3	12,143	57.2	7.1	25.2	4.1	4.2	1.5	0.6	7,466	4,418	61.5	36.4	3,048
Åre	89.2	7.0	6,335	42.9	12.0	31.4	8.0	3.3	1.8	0.6	2,927	3,259	46.2	51.4	332
Östersund	89.2	40.7	37,015	47.5	13.8	23.6	8.0	5.1	1.4	0.7	19,441	16,833	52.5	45.5	2,608
Total	89.0	1.7	91,048	50.4	10.8	26.2	6.2	4.5	1.4	0.6	49,965	39,325	54.9	43.2	10,640
Source: SCB

=== Jönköping ===
Location	Turnout	Share	Votes	S	M	C	FP	VPK	KDS	Other	L-vote	R-vote	Left	Right	Margin
Location		%			%	%	%	%	%	%			%	%	
Aneby	92.6	2.3	4,561	25.7	21.0	35.3	11.5	1.3	5.1	0.1	1,231	3,091	27.0	67.8	1,860
Eksjö	91.8	6.2	12,451	32.9	20.4	29.7	11.1	1.8	3.9	0.3	4,319	7,611	34.7	61.1	3,292
Gislaved	93.2	8.6	17,406	36.4	18.1	29.5	10.9	2.6	2.3	0.3	6,793	10,170	39.0	58.4	3,377
Gnosjö	93.8	2.7	5,447	30.0	20.9	27.6	11.9	2.5	7.0	0.0	1,769	3,294	32.5	60.5	1,525
Jönköping	92.1	35.8	72,186	41.2	20.7	17.2	12.1	4.0	4.4	0.4	32,686	36,082	45.3	50.0	3,396
Nässjö	92.3	11.0	22,223	42.2	16.6	23.2	11.2	3.5	3.0	0.3	10,134	11,342	45.6	51.0	1,208
Sävsjö	91.6	3.9	7,920	25.8	21.8	36.2	9.2	1.8	5.0	0.2	2,190	5,318	27.7	67.1	3,128
Tranås	90.8	6.2	12,569	41.4	20.1	18.4	12.6	3.0	4.2	0.4	5,579	6,419	44.4	51.1	840
Vaggeryd	93.3	4.0	8,034	35.7	18.1	26.2	9.0	3.9	6.8	0.3	3,184	4,277	39.6	53.2	1,093
Vetlanda	90.8	9.5	19,091	32.7	18.5	32.2	9.9	2.5	3.8	0.3	6,735	11,564	35.3	60.6	4,829
Värnamo	92.7	9.9	19,989	33.9	20.0	27.1	10.9	2.7	4.9	0.5	7,322	11,598	36.6	58.0	4,276
Total	92.1	3.7	201,877	37.4	19.6	23.9	11.3	3.2	4.2	0.3	81,942	110,766	40.6	54.9	28,824
Source: SCB

=== Kalmar ===
Location	Turnout	Share	Votes	S	M	C	FP	VPK	KDS	Other	L-vote	R-vote	Left	Right	Margin
Location		%			%	%	%	%	%	%			%	%	
Borgholm	90.0	4.6	7,614	25.9	17.8	45.2	5.2	3.3	2.5	0.2	2,223	5,186	29.2	68.1	2,963
Emmaboda	92.6	4.6	7,630	45.5	14.1	29.9	5.4	3.4	1.5	0.2	3,732	3,768	48.9	49.4	36
Hultsfred	92.1	7.6	12,446	43.9	16.8	26.5	6.5	3.4	2.8	0.1	5,883	6,190	47.3	49.7	307
Högsby	92.8	3.4	5,618	45.0	16.6	25.7	5.2	4.2	3.0	0.2	2,767	2,670	49.3	47.5	97
Kalmar	90.9	22.1	36,292	44.5	23.7	16.3	9.4	4.5	1.2	0.4	17,774	17,911	49.0	49.4	137
Mönsterås	91.7	5.4	8,889	49.4	15.9	21.1	5.6	5.0	2.6	0.3	4,840	3,788	54.4	42.6	1,052
Mörbylånga	92.3	5.1	8,341	34.6	23.3	30.1	8.4	2.7	0.8	0.1	3,111	5,155	37.3	61.8	2,044
Nybro	92.2	9.0	14,811	45.2	15.9	26.3	5.9	4.4	2.1	0.2	7,350	7,119	49.6	48.1	231
Oskarshamn	91.6	11.3	18,516	50.4	17.5	16.9	9.1	3.6	2.2	0.4	9,994	8,046	54.0	43.5	1,948
Torsås	91.4	3.3	5,478	33.3	20.1	36.6	6.3	1.2	2.5	0.1	1,885	3,452	34.4	63.0	1,567
Vimmerby	92.0	6.7	11,097	35.8	17.7	37.5	4.5	2.8	1.6	0.1	4,287	6,619	38.6	59.6	2,332
Västervik	90.1	16.9	27,725	50.0	16.5	19.9	6.6	4.9	1.7	0.4	15,216	11,921	54.9	43.0	3,295
Total	91.3	3.0	164,457	44.1	18.6	24.0	7.1	4.0	1.9	0.3	79,062	81,825	48.1	49.8	2,763
Source: SCB

=== Kronoberg ===
Location	Turnout	Share	Votes	S	M	C	FP	VPK	KDS	Other	L-vote	R-vote	Left	Right	Margin
Location		%			%	%	%	%	%	%			%	%	
Alvesta	90.7	11.0	12,516	36.9	19.3	31.0	7.7	3.4	1.2	0.6	5,035	7,261	40.2	58.0	2,226
Lessebo	94.5	5.7	6,151	55.7	13.7	17.1	5.2	7.1	1.0	0.1	3,867	2,215	62.9	36.0	1,652
Ljungby	90.0	15.3	17,405	33.7	18.6	33.0	8.9	3.2	2.2	0.3	6,426	10,527	36.9	60.5	4,101
Markaryd	90.3	6.6	7,473	41.9	16.1	27.6	8.1	3.2	2.8	0.3	3,373	3,868	45.1	51.8	495
Tingsryd	89.6	8.8	10,028	33.0	21.1	35.5	3.4	5.8	0.9	0.1	3,652	6,262	36.4	62.4	2,610
Uppvidinge	91.6	6.7	7,659	43.2	14.8	29.4	5.7	5.9	0.8	0.2	3,766	3,818	49.2	49.8	52
Växjö	91.0	36.8	41,775	36.7	24.5	22.8	9.6	4.8	1.1	0.5	17,311	23,780	41.4	56.9	6,469
Älmhult	92.0	9.2	10,460	41.1	21.4	26.2	6.8	3.0	1.4	0.2	4,612	5,686	44.1	54.4	1,074
Total	91.0	2.1	113,467	38.1	20.6	27.2	8.1	4.2	1.4	0.4	48,042	63,417	42.3	55.9	15,375
Source: SCB

=== Norrbotten ===
Location	Turnout	Share	Votes	S	M	C	FP	VPK	KDS	Other	L-vote	R-vote	Left	Right	Margin
Location		%			%	%	%	%	%	%			%	%	
Arjeplog	86.6	1.6	2,717	48.1	7.5	15.8	7.1	17.1	2.3	2.0	1,773	824	65.3	30.3	949
Arvidsjaur	90.5	3.3	5,704	56.3	5.6	15.6	6.4	11.5	2.7	1.9	3,872	1,572	67.9	27.6	2,300
Boden	91.6	11.4	19,736	55.9	12.6	13.6	7.2	7.4	2.1	1.2	12,489	6,585	63.3	33.4	5,904
Gällivare	87.0	9.1	15,699	53.9	11.3	9.1	4.7	15.7	0.9	4.4	10,935	3,934	69.7	25.1	7,001
Haparanda	88.7	2.9	5,014	49.5	14.0	22.1	4.9	5.2	1.2	3.1	2,742	2,054	54.7	41.0	688
Jokkmokk	84.6	2.7	4,688	58.2	9.2	11.0	6.0	11.4	0.9	3.3	3,264	1,229	69.6	26.2	2,035
Kalix	92.5	7.4	12,757	62.3	8.4	15.4	4.3	5.5	1.1	2.8	8,654	3,597	67.8	28.2	5,057
Kiruna	86.2	10.0	17,283	58.7	8.8	7.3	6.3	14.6	1.3	3.0	12,668	3,877	73.3	22.4	8,791
Luleå	91.3	25.1	43,276	52.1	13.2	13.5	7.7	10.1	1.5	1.9	26,914	14,865	62.2	34.3	12,049
Pajala	89.0	3.4	5,877	45.9	9.4	14.0	3.2	19.6	2.5	5.4	3,853	1,563	65.6	26.6	2,290
Piteå	93.6	14.8	25,596	60.1	8.1	15.8	4.9	6.0	3.9	1.3	16,911	7,357	66.1	28.7	9,554
Älvsbyn	92.3	3.8	6,473	56.2	6.0	15.0	4.8	11.3	4.8	2.0	4,367	1,670	67.5	25.8	2,697
Överkalix	89.0	2.1	3,620	58.2	5.5	19.0	3.1	10.4	0.6	3.1	2,484	1,001	68.6	27.7	1,483
Övertorneå	91.2	2.4	4,147	45.0	8.8	27.1	3.0	11.7	1.5	2.8	2,352	1,613	56.7	38.9	739
Total	90.3	3.2	172,587	55.4	10.3	13.8	5.9	10.3	2.0	2.4	113,278	51,741	65.6	30.0	61,537
Source: SCB

=== Skåne ===
Skåne was divided into the two counties of Kristianstad and Malmöhus. The latter county had two separate constituencies; Fyrstadskretsen (the four-city constituency) and the rural part of Malmöhus.

==== Kristianstad ====
Location	Turnout	Share	Votes	S	M	C	FP	VPK	KDS	Other	L-vote	R-vote	Left	Right	Margin
Location		%			%	%	%	%	%	%			%	%	
Bromölla	92.5	4.1	7,513	62.5	12.2	10.2	9.3	4.9	0.7	0.2	5,062	2,378	67.4	31.7	2,684
Båstad	91.5	4.4	8,134	18.2	34.2	34.5	9.8	0.9	0.6	1.8	1,554	6,379	19.1	78.4	4,825
Hässleholm	90.3	17.5	32,227	35.8	22.9	26.0	10.7	2.2	1.8	0.6	12,234	19,207	38.0	59.6	6,973
Klippan	90.5	5.8	10,740	40.5	23.6	23.7	9.1	1.6	0.7	0.7	4,522	6,059	42.1	56.4	1,537
Kristianstad	90.7	25.2	46,376	43.5	22.6	16.0	13.5	2.5	1.1	0.7	21,344	24,193	46.0	52.2	2,849
Osby	90.7	5.0	9,278	43.7	16.3	25.5	8.9	3.0	2.0	0.5	4,340	4,704	46.8	50.7	364
Perstorp	90.1	2.4	4,496	45.3	22.6	19.8	8.5	1.5	1.5	0.8	2,103	2,289	46.8	50.9	186
Simrishamn	88.2	7.5	13,745	36.9	24.0	23.2	11.9	1.6	0.6	1.7	5,287	8,137	38.5	59.2	2,850
Tomelilla	87.6	4.6	8,518	32.4	23.7	31.3	10.0	1.4	0.8	0.3	2,884	5,537	33.9	65.0	2,653
Åstorp	92.0	4.2	7,798	48.3	21.5	17.0	9.4	2.5	0.9	0.4	3,962	3,739	50.8	47.9	223
Ängelholm	91.0	10.8	19,873	31.3	32.8	21.9	10.3	1.7	1.0	1.0	6,572	12,909	33.1	65.0	6,337
Örkelljunga	90.5	3.2	5,940	26.0	31.2	27.0	10.0	1.1	4.4	0.2	1,614	4,050	27.2	68.2	2,436
Östra Göinge	91.2	5.3	9,734	52.9	14.9	18.2	8.9	2.7	1.7	0.6	5,413	4,095	55.6	42.1	1,318
Total	90.5	3.4	184,372	39.5	23.6	21.7	10.9	2.2	1.3	0.8	76,891	103,676	41.7	56.2	26,785
Source: SCB

==== Malmö area ====
Location	Turnout	Share	Votes	S	M	C	FP	VPK	KDS	Other	L-vote	R-vote	Left	Right	Margin
Location		%			%	%	%	%	%	%			%	%	
Helsingborg	90.4	22.2	67,720	44.1	28.0	11.0	11.7	3.5	0.6	1.2	32,192	34,309	47.5	50.7	2,117
Landskrona	91.3	8.0	24,306	54.6	22.7	8.8	9.7	2.8	0.5	1.0	13,947	9,996	57.4	41.1	3,951
Lund	92.3	16.8	51,328	36.7	26.1	12.7	13.8	9.1	0.5	1.0	23,522	27,038	45.8	52.7	3,516
Malmö	90.1	53.0	161,383	47.0	29.0	6.9	11.5	4.0	0.4	1.2	82,289	76,435	51.0	47.4	5,854
Total	90.6	5.6	304,737	45.2	27.8	8.9	11.8	4.6	0.5	1.1	151,950	147,778	49.9	48.5	4,172
Source: SCB

==== Malmöhus ====
Location	Turnout	Share	Votes	S	M	C	FP	VPK	KDS	Other	L-vote	R-vote	Left	Right	Margin
Location		%			%	%	%	%	%	%			%	%	
Bjuv	92.0	4.6	8,738	57.6	15.9	14.3	9.4	1.9	0.5	0.4	5,204	3,454	59.6	39.5	1,750
Burlöv	93.2	4.7	8,791	53.5	21.8	8.7	11.7	3.6	0.3	0.3	5,018	3,715	57.1	42.3	1,303
Eslöv	90.3	9.3	17,598	43.2	19.9	24.3	9.2	2.5	0.6	0.3	8,033	9,398	45.6	53.4	1,365
Höganäs	93.0	7.8	14,667	38.7	32.9	14.5	10.3	1.8	1.0	0.7	5,942	8,469	40.5	57.7	2,527
Hörby	90.8	4.5	8,517	25.7	21.0	35.8	14.1	1.0	2.2	0.3	2,276	6,034	26.7	70.8	3,758
Höör	90.2	3.7	7,038	29.4	26.7	28.7	12.1	1.6	0.8	0.8	2,180	4,751	31.0	67.5	2,571
Kävlinge	94.1	6.8	12,891	48.6	21.6	16.3	11.1	1.9	0.2	0.2	6,509	6,322	50.5	49.0	187
Lomma	95.3	5.5	10,414	35.5	36.5	12.1	13.7	1.7	0.2	0.4	3,871	6,487	37.2	62.3	2,616
Sjöbo	90.6	5.3	9,978	32.4	20.1	36.6	8.9	1.4	0.3	0.2	3,378	6,552	33.9	65.7	3,174
Skurup	92.5	4.4	8,343	38.6	19.5	30.1	9.9	1.3	0.3	0.3	3,325	4,962	39.9	59.5	1,637
Staffanstorp	94.7	5.2	9,851	36.8	31.0	15.9	13.4	2.3	0.2	0.3	3,858	5,940	39.2	60.3	2,082
Svalöv	91.8	4.4	8,371	41.8	18.9	27.3	8.2	1.3	0.5	1.9	3,610	4,562	43.1	54.5	952
Svedala	94.1	5.0	9,502	47.1	23.1	16.2	11.3	1.7	0.4	0.2	4,637	4,806	48.8	50.6	169
Trelleborg	91.7	12.1	22,809	52.6	20.1	14.4	10.4	1.5	0.7	0.2	12,339	10,242	54.1	44.9	2,097
Vellinge	95.5	7.7	14,493	27.6	44.9	11.5	14.3	0.8	0.2	0.7	4,112	10,259	28.4	70.8	6,147
Ystad	90.9	8.9	16,786	44.8	22.6	18.5	11.9	1.6	0.3	0.2	7,785	8,909	46.4	53.1	1,124
Total	92.5	3.5	188,787	41.7	25.0	19.3	11.2	1.7	0.5	0.4	82,077	104,862	43.5	55.5	22,785
Source: SCB

=== Stockholm County ===
==== Stockholm ====
Location	Turnout	Share	Votes	S	M	C	FP	VPK	KDS	Other	L-vote	R-vote	Left	Right	Margin
Location		%			%	%	%	%	%	%			%	%	
Stockholm	89.0	100.0	453,287	37.8	29.2	9.0	11.7	10.5	0.8	1.0	218,987	226,161	48.3	49.9	7,174
Total	89.0	8.3	453,287	37.8	29.2	9.0	11.7	10.5	0.8	1.0	218,987	226,161	48.3	49.9	7,174
Source: SCB

==== Stockholm County ====
Location	Turnout	Share	Votes	S	M	C	FP	VPK	KDS	Other	L-vote	R-vote	Left	Right	Margin
Location		%			%	%	%	%	%	%			%	%	
Botkyrka	89.8	7.2	36,600	44.2	22.9	11.4	12.3	7.6	0.8	0.8	18,935	17,076	51.7	46.7	1,859
Danderyd	95.1	3.6	18,567	17.6	54.0	10.3	13.4	3.9	0.5	0.3	3,981	14,434	21.4	77.7	10,453
Ekerö	93.6	1.8	9,317	29.6	32.6	17.6	12.9	6.2	0.6	0.5	3,334	5,881	35.8	63.1	2,547
Haninge	89.4	5.9	29,972	43.9	20.7	13.1	11.6	9.2	0.6	1.0	15,913	13,596	53.1	45.4	2,317
Huddinge	90.7	7.3	37,478	39.9	25.5	11.6	12.8	8.5	0.8	0.9	18,139	18,714	48.4	49.9	575
Järfälla	92.2	6.0	30,766	38.8	27.1	10.9	14.5	7.0	1.1	0.6	14,107	16,143	45.9	52.5	2,036
Lidingö	92.9	4.9	24,749	21.4	47.3	10.5	14.0	5.8	0.4	0.5	6,736	17,775	27.2	71.8	11,039
Nacka	91.7	6.6	33,495	34.0	34.2	9.9	12.3	8.5	0.5	0.6	14,234	18,888	42.5	56.4	4,654
Norrtälje	89.0	5.1	26,072	40.5	19.1	26.4	7.9	4.5	1.4	0.2	11,731	13,919	45.0	53.4	2,188
Nynäshamn	92.1	2.5	12,920	51.0	15.1	15.6	9.0	7.9	1.0	0.4	7,610	5,132	58.9	39.7	2,478
Sigtuna	89.8	3.1	15,640	41.2	23.2	17.3	10.0	6.6	1.0	0.7	7,478	7,902	47.8	50.5	424
Sollentuna	92.9	5.6	28,372	33.0	31.5	13.5	12.8	7.3	1.2	0.7	11,448	16,421	40.3	57.9	4,973
Solna	89.4	7.3	36,998	37.1	30.4	8.8	13.3	8.7	0.6	1.1	16,946	19,420	45.8	52.5	2,474
Sundbyberg	89.8	3.5	17,720	49.6	19.7	8.6	10.6	10.2	0.5	0.8	10,583	6,905	59.7	39.0	3,678
Södertälje	89.4	8.6	43,789	46.5	19.9	14.8	10.1	6.6	1.2	0.9	23,237	19,641	53.1	44.9	3,596
Tyresö	92.0	3.3	16,792	38.3	27.0	11.6	13.3	8.7	0.4	0.6	7,885	8,720	47.0	51.9	835
Täby	93.3	5.5	28,029	26.8	40.3	13.7	12.8	5.3	0.5	0.7	8,982	18,705	32.0	66.7	9,723
Upplands-Bro	91.7	1.9	9,726	44.4	21.8	13.7	11.1	7.2	1.3	0.4	5,012	4,540	51.5	46.7	472
Upplands-Väsby	91.0	3.2	16,417	41.9	23.5	12.8	12.1	7.8	0.8	1.0	8,165	7,957	49.7	48.5	208
Vallentuna	92.4	2.0	10,021	31.2	31.1	19.7	10.4	5.5	1.4	0.8	3,677	6,126	36.7	61.1	2,449
Vaxholm	91.9	3.3	16,975	34.0	31.9	15.0	12.2	5.8	0.5	0.6	6,755	10,031	39.8	59.1	3,276
Värmdö	91.5	1.9	9,795	42.7	26.0	14.4	8.9	6.7	0.6	0.6	4,835	4,832	49.4	49.3	3
Total	91.2	9.4	510,210	37.8	28.3	13.2	12.0	7.2	0.8	0.7	229,723	272,758	45.0	53.5	43,035
Source: SCB

=== Södermanland ===
Location	Turnout	Share	Votes	S	M	C	FP	VPK	KDS	Other	L-vote	R-vote	Left	Right	Margin
Location		%			%	%	%	%	%	%			%	%	
Eskilstuna	91.1	34.7	56,858	53.6	15.6	13.1	12.0	4.0	1.1	0.7	32,725	23,154	57.6	40.7	9,571
Flen	92.3	7.2	11,747	49.5	14.6	21.9	8.5	3.5	1.5	0.5	6,226	5,293	53.0	45.1	933
Katrineholm	92.3	13.4	21,866	52.2	14.5	17.5	10.5	3.1	1.7	0.5	12,089	9,300	55.3	42.5	2,789
Nyköping	92.4	26.0	42,594	48.5	18.1	18.6	9.1	3.7	1.5	0.5	22,226	19,536	52.2	45.9	2,690
Oxelösund	91.9	5.3	8,755	62.1	11.5	9.0	8.3	8.0	0.6	0.4	6,139	2,520	70.1	28.8	3,619
Strängnäs	92.0	9.4	15,400	41.9	21.7	17.9	12.9	3.8	1.0	0.6	7,042	8,096	45.7	52.6	1,054
Vingåker	92.6	4.0	6,521	47.3	12.4	23.1	11.4	3.1	2.2	0.3	3,292	3,062	50.5	47.0	230
Total	91.9	3.0	163,741	50.9	16.3	16.4	10.7	3.9	1.3	0.5	89,739	70,961	54.8	43.3	18,778
Source: SCB

=== Uppsala ===
Location	Turnout	Share	Votes	S	M	C	FP	VPK	KDS	Other	L-vote	R-vote	Left	Right	Margin
Location		%			%	%	%	%	%	%			%	%	
Enköping	89.7	13.2	20,242	42.3	18.7	26.7	8.1	2.8	1.0	0.4	9,124	10,827	45.1	53.5	1,703
Håbo	92.8	4.4	6,734	40.4	26.1	17.1	10.6	4.6	0.7	0.5	3,029	3,625	45.0	53.8	596
Tierp	92.2	9.3	14,273	53.4	8.6	25.2	8.4	2.4	1.8	0.1	7,965	6,032	55.8	42.3	1,933
Uppsala	90.5	60.4	92,988	38.1	21.4	17.4	12.4	8.8	1.1	0.8	43,565	47,652	46.9	51.2	4,087
Älvkarleby	92.9	4.3	6,666	71.1	6.4	10.5	6.5	4.8	0.6	0.0	5,061	1,562	75.9	23.4	3,499
Östhammar	90.1	8.4	12,963	47.0	13.2	27.4	7.2	3.7	1.1	0.4	6,565	6,194	50.6	47.8	371
Total	90.7	2.8	153,866	42.3	18.8	19.9	10.7	6.6	1.1	0.6	75,309	75,892	48.9	49.3	583
Source: SCB

=== Värmland ===
Location	Turnout	Share	Votes	S	M	C	FP	VPK	KDS	Other	L-vote	R-vote	Left	Right	Margin
Location		%			%	%	%	%	%	%			%	%	
Arvika	89.5	9.5	18,582	44.4	15.8	23.0	9.8	5.3	0.6	1.0	9,240	9,031	49.7	48.6	209
Eda	91.1	3.3	6,364	50.1	12.6	25.4	7.1	3.4	1.0	0.4	3,404	2,871	53.5	45.1	533
Filipstad	91.4	5.3	10,332	61.0	12.4	12.3	7.1	5.9	0.6	0.6	6,914	3,292	66.9	31.9	3,622
Forshaga	93.0	4.0	7,911	55.9	12.1	18.6	7.7	3.9	1.0	0.7	4,733	3,039	59.8	38.4	1,694
Grums	91.5	3.7	7,281	56.9	11.2	19.4	6.1	5.2	0.7	0.5	4,521	2,669	62.1	36.7	1,852
Hagfors	93.1	6.6	12,861	62.3	8.5	16.8	3.6	7.6	0.7	0.5	8,994	3,715	69.9	28.9	5,279
Hammarö	93.9	4.0	7,840	56.7	17.2	11.3	8.3	5.2	0.2	1.1	4,858	2,879	62.0	36.7	1,979
Karlstad	91.6	26.3	51,435	43.5	24.2	16.1	10.0	4.8	0.6	0.9	24,820	25,864	48.3	50.3	1,044
Kil	92.7	3.6	7,028	40.5	20.0	23.2	11.7	3.4	0.3	0.9	3,082	3,860	43.9	54.9	778
Kristinehamn	90.8	9.5	18,498	49.6	16.7	16.4	11.0	5.0	1.1	0.3	10,089	8,159	54.5	44.1	1,930
Munkfors	94.2	2.0	3,871	67.4	8.0	13.7	5.3	4.8	0.5	0.3	2,797	1,044	72.3	27.0	1,753
Storfors	93.3	1.9	3,621	58.7	12.5	16.6	7.3	3.9	0.7	0.3	2,266	1,320	62.6	36.5	946
Sunne	91.6	4.9	9,641	33.2	18.9	36.8	8.3	1.8	0.8	0.1	3,376	6,176	35.0	64.1	2,800
Säffle	90.0	6.6	13,012	39.1	17.4	30.0	8.3	3.7	1.3	0.2	5,573	7,256	42.8	55.8	1,683
Torsby	90.9	5.7	11,169	47.9	13.6	24.5	4.9	8.0	0.6	0.4	6,246	4,808	55.9	43.0	1,438
Årjäng	83.9	3.2	6,258	28.3	19.1	35.7	12.7	2.1	2.0	0.2	1,900	4,221	30.4	67.4	2,321
Total	91.2	3.6	195,704	47.7	17.2	20.2	8.6	4.9	0.8	0.6	102,813	90,204	52.5	46.1	12,609
Source: SCB

=== Västerbotten ===
Location	Turnout	Share	Votes	S	M	C	FP	VPK	KDS	Other	L-vote	R-vote	Left	Right	Margin
Location		%			%	%	%	%	%	%			%	%	
Dorotea	90.7	1.7	2,772	57.1	5.8	20.7	11.3	3.8	1.1	0.3	1,688	1,047	60.9	37.8	641
Lycksele	90.8	6.1	9,884	48.8	7.9	15.2	15.9	4.9	7.0	0.2	5,309	3,861	53.7	39.1	1,448
Nordmaling	91.6	3.4	5,501	44.9	11.5	27.7	9.6	2.8	3.5	0.0	2,626	2,680	47.7	48.7	54
Norsjö	88.3	4.1	6,661	49.8	7.7	20.6	12.7	5.1	3.2	0.8	3,657	2,731	54.9	41.0	926
Robertsfors	91.8	3.3	5,305	33.2	9.9	37.3	13.3	2.5	3.1	0.6	1,893	3,211	35.7	60.5	1,318
Skellefteå	90.8	30.7	49,788	51.3	10.1	20.6	10.0	4.1	3.3	0.6	27,559	20,265	55.4	40.7	7,294
Sorsele	86.2	1.6	2,622	41.8	7.1	24.1	13.7	3.5	7.3	2.5	1,188	1,178	45.3	44.9	10
Storuman	86.3	3.3	5,393	43.0	13.2	18.3	16.0	3.2	6.1	0.3	2,487	2,559	46.1	47.5	72
Umeå	90.9	32.1	51,943	43.0	12.7	19.1	13.7	8.5	2.1	0.9	26,765	23,625	51.5	45.5	3,140
Vilhelmina	89.0	3.7	5,949	53.0	6.5	19.4	11.5	4.5	4.8	0.3	3,419	2,227	57.5	37.4	1,192
Vindeln	90.7	3.1	4,966	37.2	12.2	26.3	17.7	2.8	3.6	0.2	1,988	2,792	40.0	56.2	804
Vännäs	90.8	4.8	7,777	40.0	11.7	27.9	13.0	4.1	3.0	0.4	3,426	4,086	44.1	52.5	660
Åsele	88.7	2.1	3,380	55.9	7.4	20.5	10.5	2.9	2.7	0.1	1,987	1,296	58.8	38.3	691
Total	90.4	3.0	161,941	46.5	10.7	21.0	12.5	5.4	3.3	0.6	83,992	71,558	51.9	44.2	12,434
Source: SCB

=== Västernorrland ===
Location	Turnout	Share	Votes	S	M	C	FP	VPK	KDS	Other	L-vote	R-vote	Left	Right	Margin
Location		%			%	%	%	%	%	%			%	%	
Härnösand	92.0	10.4	19,290	42.1	15.2	29.5	5.8	5.8	1.3	0.4	9,231	9,735	47.9	50.5	504
Kramfors	93.3	10.6	19,735	54.7	8.1	25.0	3.0	6.6	1.5	1.2	12,086	7,113	61.2	36.0	4,973
Sollefteå	92.5	10.2	18,882	58.0	9.1	22.3	3.0	5.4	1.5	0.7	11,977	6,505	63.4	34.5	5,472
Sundsvall	91.2	34.3	63,658	50.0	13.1	20.3	8.4	6.1	1.2	0.9	35,693	26,608	56.1	41.8	9,085
Timrå	92.3	6.8	12,616	58.6	7.7	20.3	4.9	6.5	1.7	0.4	8,206	4,148	65.0	32.9	4,058
Ånge	91.4	5.2	9,707	53.4	7.2	26.8	4.5	6.4	1.5	0.2	5,807	3,732	59.8	38.4	2,075
Örnsköldsvik	92.6	22.6	41,906	49.8	9.0	26.2	8.2	3.1	3.1	0.7	22,198	18,165	53.0	43.3	4,033
Total	92.0	3.4	185,794	51.2	10.8	23.6	6.5	5.4	1.8	0.7	105,198	76,006	56.6	40.9	29,192
Source: SCB

=== Västmanland ===
Location	Turnout	Share	Votes	S	M	C	FP	VPK	KDS	Other	L-vote	R-vote	Left	Right	Margin
Location		%			%	%	%	%	%	%			%	%	
Arboga	91.0	6.0	9,853	51.0	15.2	17.1	10.7	4.2	1.2	0.7	5,435	4,241	55.2	43.0	1,194
Fagersta	92.3	6.0	9,864	62.6	11.6	11.3	8.5	4.0	0.7	1.3	6,568	3,092	66.6	31.3	3,476
Hallstahammar	91.4	6.6	10,862	60.4	11.6	11.3	8.9	5.8	0.9	1.0	7,190	3,463	66.2	31.9	3,727
Heby	90.2	5.3	8,758	43.3	9.7	34.1	7.4	4.1	1.1	0.2	4,154	4,483	47.4	51.2	329
Kungsör	92.9	3.3	5,441	49.0	14.4	19.5	10.9	4.7	1.2	0.3	2,921	2,440	53.7	44.8	481
Köping	90.3	10.2	16,811	54.3	12.0	17.5	8.3	5.6	1.6	0.7	10,056	6,361	59.8	37.8	3,695
Norberg	91.5	2.7	4,508	60.9	10.8	13.4	4.9	7.4	1.2	1.4	3,077	1,312	68.3	29.1	1,765
Sala	91.2	8.5	14,026	39.7	14.8	29.7	9.8	3.9	1.6	0.5	6,120	7,622	43.6	54.3	1,502
Skinnskatteberg	90.9	2.0	3,283	61.0	8.9	17.2	5.8	5.4	1.0	0.7	2,181	1,046	66.4	31.9	1,135
Surahammar	93.6	4.1	6,739	64.8	9.3	10.5	7.6	5.8	0.7	1.4	4,759	1,844	70.6	27.4	2,915
Västerås	90.0	45.1	73,911	47.1	20.8	11.3	13.3	5.4	0.9	1.3	38,761	33,525	52.4	45.4	5,236
Total	90.7	3.0	164,056	50.5	16.1	15.5	10.7	5.1	1.1	1.0	91,222	69,429	55.6	42.3	21,793
Source: SCB

=== Västra Götaland ===
Västra Götaland County did in 1979 consist of three separate counties; Göteborg och Bohuslän, Skaraborg and Älvsborg. The city of Gothenburg and the Bohuslän part of the county were divided into separate constituencies as well as Älvsborg being divided into a northern and southern part.

==== Bohuslän ====
Location	Turnout	Share	Votes	S	M	C	FP	VPK	KDS	Other	L-vote	R-vote	Left	Right	Margin
Location		%			%	%	%	%	%	%			%	%	
Härryda	92.0	7.6	13,541	33.7	24.0	17.9	17.5	5.5	0.8	0.5	5,318	8,038	39.3	59.4	2,720
Kungälv	92.1	10.4	18,703	36.0	22.7	21.4	14.4	4.0	1.2	0.3	7,488	10,943	40.0	58.5	3,455
Lysekil	91.4	5.7	10,152	52.5	16.3	13.8	13.3	3.3	0.5	0.3	5,665	4,407	55.8	43.4	1,258
Munkedal	90.8	3.9	7,048	37.4	15.4	34.6	9.0	2.4	1.0	0.3	2,805	4,152	39.8	58.9	1,347
Mölndal	91.0	16.9	30,269	39.0	22.2	13.4	16.5	7.0	1.2	0.6	13,924	15,770	46.0	52.1	1,846
Orust	89.3	4.3	7,790	31.3	19.0	31.8	14.6	2.3	0.4	0.5	2,620	5,094	33.6	65.4	2,474
Partille	92.1	9.6	17,178	35.2	27.1	11.7	18.1	6.5	0.9	0.3	7,171	9,783	41.7	57.0	2,612
Sotenäs	90.6	3.6	6,474	43.9	18.6	17.6	15.8	2.6	1.3	0.6	2,987	3,363	46.4	51.9	376
Stenungsund	89.9	5.2	9,392	35.5	23.1	21.8	14.7	3.5	0.6	0.7	3,661	5,610	39.0	59.7	1,949
Strömstad	87.6	3.5	6,255	41.7	15.9	25.7	12.6	2.3	1.4	0.4	2,752	3,388	44.0	54.2	636
Tanum	87.9	4.3	7,623	25.7	19.4	38.8	13.4	1.8	0.6	0.4	2,092	5,462	27.4	71.7	3,370
Tjörn	89.2	4.1	7,332	22.3	27.7	21.0	23.1	2.2	3.5	0.3	1,790	5,269	24.4	71.9	3,479
Uddevalla	90.4	17.4	31,157	45.1	17.2	20.4	11.7	4.1	0.8	0.8	15,320	15,358	49.2	49.3	38
Öckerö	90.2	3.4	6,171	24.0	29.5	15.2	22.0	2.5	5.9	0.9	1,632	4,114	26.4	66.7	2,482
Total	90.7	3.3	179,085	37.7	21.3	19.8	15.2	4.3	1.2	0.5	75,225	100,751	42.0	56.3	25,526
Source: SCB

==== Gothenburg ====
Location	Turnout	Share	Votes	S	M	C	FP	VPK	KDS	Other	L-vote	R-vote	Left	Right	Margin
Location		%			%	%	%	%	%	%			%	%	
Gothenburg	88.7	100.0	282,944	37.6	24.7	9.6	16.2	9.9	0.9	1.2	134,297	142,726	47.5	50.4	8,429
Total	88.7	5.2	282,944	37.6	24.7	9.6	16.2	9.9	0.9	1.2	134,297	142,726	47.5	50.4	8,429
Source: SCB

==== Skaraborg ====
Location	Turnout	Share	Votes	S	M	C	FP	VPK	KDS	Other	L-vote	R-vote	Left	Right	Margin
Location		%			%	%	%	%	%	%			%	%	
Falköping	91.5	12.6	22,301	32.4	20.1	32.4	9.2	3.0	2.5	0.6	7,879	13,742	35.3	61.6	5,863
Grästorp	91.4	2.1	3,776	23.1	23.3	39.6	10.7	1.7	1.0	0.8	936	2,777	24.8	73.5	1,841
Gullspång	89.8	2.5	4,442	42.2	16.5	29.2	7.0	3.0	1.8	0.2	2,011	2,341	45.3	52.7	330
Götene	91.7	4.7	8,357	37.2	18.2	25.2	11.8	3.4	3.7	0.6	3,387	4,607	40.5	55.1	1,220
Habo	93.3	2.7	4,815	30.7	22.9	26.0	12.9	1.9	5.3	0.2	1,570	2,979	32.6	61.9	1,409
Hjo	91.1	3.2	5,645	36.7	22.7	23.5	9.1	3.1	4.2	0.7	2,243	3,123	39.7	55.3	880
Karlsborg	92.5	3.2	5,737	44.5	18.1	23.3	9.3	2.1	2.1	0.7	2,671	2,906	46.6	50.7	235
Lidköping	90.0	13.2	23,380	39.6	18.6	22.0	11.5	5.2	1.9	1.2	10,484	12,184	44.8	52.1	1,700
Mariestad	90.6	8.9	15,819	41.3	20.5	21.2	9.8	3.6	2.6	0.9	7,110	8,140	44.9	51.5	1,030
Mullsjö	93.1	2.1	3,781	29.8	21.0	27.9	12.1	1.8	7.1	0.2	1,194	2,307	31.6	61.0	1,113
Skara	90.9	6.7	11,847	35.9	21.5	24.6	11.0	3.5	1.5	2.0	4,670	6,761	39.4	57.1	2,091
Skövde	89.5	16.2	28,627	39.0	20.1	21.7	11.7	4.4	2.0	1.1	12,420	15,297	43.4	53.4	2,877
Tibro	90.8	4.0	7,173	38.7	17.4	23.2	12.4	3.3	3.4	1.6	3,016	3,804	42.0	53.0	788
Tidaholm	92.2	5.1	9,008	45.5	15.2	24.5	7.7	3.2	2.3	1.5	4,390	4,264	48.7	47.3	126
Töreboda	89.5	3.9	6,879	34.9	18.4	34.7	7.1	2.4	1.6	1.0	2,569	4,134	37.3	60.1	1,565
Vara	90.7	8.8	15,609	22.4	27.2	37.3	9.4	1.7	1.3	0.7	3,768	11,531	24.1	73.9	7,763
Total	90.8	3.3	177,196	36.3	20.2	26.4	10.3	3.4	2.4	1.0	70,318	100,897	39.7	56.9	30,579
Source: SCB

==== Älvsborg N ====
Location	Turnout	Share	Votes	S	M	C	FP	VPK	KDS	Other	L-vote	R-vote	Left	Right	Margin
Location		%			%	%	%	%	%	%			%	%	
Ale	92.7	8.5	13,401	45.1	15.3	21.3	11.4	5.2	1.6	0.1	6,744	6,429	50.3	48.0	315
Alingsås	91.7	12.2	19,208	35.8	20.6	20.6	16.5	4.1	2.2	0.3	7,657	11,078	39.9	57.7	3,421
Bengtsfors	90.4	5.3	8,375	42.9	14.1	29.9	8.3	2.6	2.0	0.2	3,815	4,377	45.6	52.3	562
Dals-Ed	90.5	2.2	3,482	26.4	14.5	45.6	8.6	1.8	3.0	0.3	979	2,389	28.1	68.6	1,410
Färgelanda	92.0	3.1	4,861	34.2	15.8	41.1	6.4	1.9	0.5	0.1	1,755	3,076	36.1	63.3	1,321
Herrljunga	92.8	4.0	6,296	26.2	22.0	35.3	12.3	2.3	1.7	0.1	1,794	4,384	28.5	69.6	2,590
Lerum	93.7	11.3	17,838	30.0	28.6	17.7	17.6	4.9	1.0	0.2	6,225	11,402	34.9	63.9	5,177
Lilla Edet	91.5	4.5	7,065	48.4	13.3	23.9	8.9	4.3	0.9	0.3	3,723	3,257	52.7	46.1	466
Mellerud	91.2	4.7	7,378	31.4	18.9	38.0	7.3	1.8	2.4	0.2	2,451	4,737	33.2	64.2	2,286
Trollhättan	90.5	19.9	31,409	51.7	14.9	14.8	12.2	5.0	1.1	0.3	17,815	13,151	56.7	41.9	4,664
Vårgårda	92.3	3.8	5,993	24.0	21.8	34.1	14.9	2.3	3.0	0.0	1,576	4,237	26.3	70.7	2,661
Vänersborg	91.1	14.9	23,549	41.6	18.0	22.8	11.5	4.7	1.1	0.1	10,905	12,334	46.3	52.4	1,429
Åmål	89.0	5.8	9,218	45.3	18.5	23.2	8.8	2.4	1.6	0.2	4,398	4,657	47.7	50.5	259
Total	91.5	2.9	158,073	40.2	18.5	23.4	12.2	4.0	1.5	0.2	69,837	85,508	44.2	54.1	15,671
Source: SCB

==== Älvsborg S ====
Location	Turnout	Share	Votes	S	M	C	FP	VPK	KDS	Other	L-vote	R-vote	Left	Right	Margin
Location		%			%	%	%	%	%	%			%	%	
Borås	91.8	56.8	67,530	42.6	23.6	16.7	11.0	4.3	1.4	0.4	31,711	34,658	47.0	51.3	2,947
Mark	93.5	17.7	21,016	43.7	18.6	25.9	6.4	4.1	1.2	0.1	10,033	10,706	47.7	50.9	673
Svenljunga	92.8	6.0	7,164	31.4	23.2	34.3	7.9	1.4	1.7	0.1	2,349	4,682	32.8	65.4	2,333
Tranemo	94.2	6.8	8,032	38.2	17.5	32.6	8.3	2.1	1.1	0.2	3,231	4,694	40.2	58.4	1,463
Ulricehamn	93.1	12.7	15,092	28.4	23.1	32.4	11.7	2.0	2.1	0.3	4,580	10,143	30.3	67.2	5,563
Total	92.5	2.2	118,834	40.0	22.2	22.4	9.9	3.7	1.4	0.3	51,904	64,883	43.7	54.6	12,979
Source: SCB

=== Örebro ===
Location	Turnout	Share	Votes	S	M	C	FP	VPK	KDS	Other	L-vote	R-vote	Left	Right	Margin
Location		%			%	%	%	%	%	%			%	%	
Askersund	90.8	4.3	7,820	47.1	14.5	24.1	7.7	2.9	2.9	0.8	3,914	3,616	50.1	46.2	298
Degerfors	94.1	4.5	8,194	62.8	8.1	14.3	6.6	5.7	2.0	0.5	5,611	2,383	68.5	29.1	3,228
Hallsberg	91.7	6.2	11,384	51.0	10.5	21.8	9.4	4.5	2.4	0.4	6,316	4,747	55.5	41.7	1,569
Hällefors	91.0	3.8	7,035	65.4	7.3	11.6	6.0	7.8	1.3	0.7	5,146	1,758	73.1	25.0	3,388
Karlskoga	91.4	13.5	24,703	54.2	15.4	12.4	9.9	6.4	1.1	0.7	14,967	9,303	60.6	37.7	5,664
Kumla	91.1	6.4	11,745	49.0	13.5	18.9	10.3	4.9	3.0	0.4	6,321	5,013	53.8	42.7	1,308
Laxå	91.4	3.0	5,555	52.6	10.0	19.4	8.7	4.7	3.1	1.4	3,183	2,120	57.3	38.2	1,063
Lindesberg	90.4	8.9	16,377	47.3	13.5	25.0	7.5	4.2	2.1	0.5	8,442	7,521	51.5	45.9	921
Ljusnarsberg	89.3	2.6	4,736	58.1	9.1	18.4	4.9	7.7	1.7	0.2	3,117	1,533	65.8	32.4	1,584
Nora	90.3	3.6	6,515	49.3	12.7	20.5	9.9	4.5	2.1	1.0	3,511	2,801	53.9	43.0	710
Örebro	90.0	43.2	78,995	44.3	18.2	17.3	11.9	5.2	2.0	1.1	39,106	37,510	49.5	47.5	1,596
Total	90.7	3.4	183,059	49.2	14.9	17.9	10.0	5.3	2.0	0.8	99,634	78,305	54.4	42.8	21,329
Source: SCB

=== Östergötland ===
Location	Turnout	Share	Votes	S	M	C	FP	VPK	KDS	Other	L-vote	R-vote	Left	Right	Margin
Location		%			%	%	%	%	%	%			%	%	
Boxholm	92.9	1.6	4,056	53.5	9.3	24.4	5.8	4.9	1.6	0.6	2,367	1,601	58.4	39.5	766
Finspång	93.0	6.2	16,078	56.4	13.1	14.7	8.2	4.5	2.6	0.6	9,799	5,789	60.9	36.0	4,010
Kinda	92.2	2.8	7,219	34.9	18.3	35.2	6.1	1.7	3.3	0.5	2,642	4,305	36.6	59.6	1,663
Linköping	91.7	29.3	76,646	43.1	22.9	14.9	10.7	5.5	2.0	0.9	37,282	37,137	48.6	48.5	145
Mjölby	91.6	6.6	17,154	47.8	16.8	21.2	8.4	3.4	2.0	0.3	8,788	7,968	51.2	46.4	820
Motala	91.4	10.4	27,389	53.4	15.4	15.4	9.5	4.1	1.7	0.5	15,754	11,032	57.5	40.3	4,722
Norrköping	89.6	29.8	77,871	47.9	22.1	13.3	9.7	4.8	1.3	0.8	41,087	35,097	52.8	45.1	5,990
Söderköping	91.6	2.8	7,272	33.9	22.0	31.4	7.6	2.6	1.8	0.6	2,654	4,438	36.5	61.0	1,784
Vadstena	91.4	2.0	5,212	45.2	18.6	20.7	9.9	2.4	2.2	1.1	2,480	2,564	47.6	49.2	84
Valdemarsvik	92.7	2.4	6,289	46.9	15.2	26.2	5.7	3.5	1.6	0.9	3,171	2,963	50.4	47.1	208
Ydre	94.3	1.1	3,054	25.1	17.2	38.6	12.3	2.0	3.8	0.9	827	2,081	27.1	68.1	1,254
Åtvidaberg	92.8	3.4	8,770	54.4	13.5	20.4	6.9	2.5	2.1	0.2	4,995	3,581	57.0	40.8	1,414
Ödeshög	91.9	1.6	4,150	37.6	16.7	32.0	7.3	2.5	3.6	0.3	1,662	2,324	40.0	56.0	662
Total	91.2	4.8	261,160	46.6	19.8	17.2	9.4	4.5	1.9	0.7	133,508	120,880	51.1	46.3	12,628
Source: SCB
