= Peter Eriksson (Sweden Democrats politician) =

Swedish politician (born 1959)

Member of the Riksdag
- Incumbent
- Assumed office 28 September 2026
- Constituency: Jämtland County

Personal details
- Born: 1959 (age 66–67) Sweden
- Party: Sweden Democrats

Peter Eriksson (born 1959) is a Swedish politician from the Sweden Democrats and former chairman of the Swedish Hunters' Association. He has been a member of the Riksdag since 2026, elected for the Jämtland County constituency.

== Career ==
Eriksson, a resident of Skyttmon in Ragunda Municipality, was elected chairman of the Swedish Hunters' Association in June 2021. He had previously been a member of the association's board of directors since the early 2000s and was active in the Hunters' Association Mitt Norrland.

On 4 November 2025, he resigned with immediate effect to pursue politics. First vice-chairman Mikael Samuelsson then took over the chairman's duties.

== Political career ==
Eriksson began working for the Sweden Democrats in November 2025, developing the party's rural policy. According to an interview with SVT, he was recruited after contact with party leader Jimmie Åkesson.

He was elected to the Riksdag in the 2026 Swedish general election and took office on 28 September of that year. Since 6 October 2026, he has been a member of the Committee on Environment and Agriculture.

== See also ==
- List of members of the Riksdag, 2026–2030
