= Elise Ryder Wikén =

Swedish politician (born 1968)

Member of the Riksdag
- Incumbent
- Assumed office 28 September 2026
- Constituency: Jämtland County

Personal details
- Born: 21 September 1968 (age 58) Klövsjö, Sweden
- Party: Moderate Party

Elise Ryder Wikén (born 21 September 1968) is a Swedish civil engineer, surveyor, and politician from the Moderate Party. She has been a member of the Riksdag since 2026, elected for the Jämtland County constituency.

== Biography ==
Ryder Wikén is a civil engineer and surveyor and has worked as a planning architect. She is head of the community development administration in Härjedalen Municipality.

Ryder Wikén became politically involved for the Moderate Party in 2004 and has, among other things, been a member of the municipal board in Berg Municipality. She has also been a regional councillor with responsibility for regional development in the Region Jämtland Härjedalen.

She ran for parliament in the 2014 Swedish general election and was appointed as a substitute for the Moderates in the Jämtland County constituency. After the 2018 Swedish general election, she was the first substitute for the Moderates in the constituency.

At the 2026 Swedish general election, Ryder Wikén was in first place on the Moderate Party's parliamentary election ballot in Jämtland County. She was elected as a member of parliament for the Jämtland County constituency and received 1,089 personal votes.

== See also ==
- List of members of the Riksdag, 2026–2030
