= Kalle Olsson (politician) =

Swedish politician (born 1984)

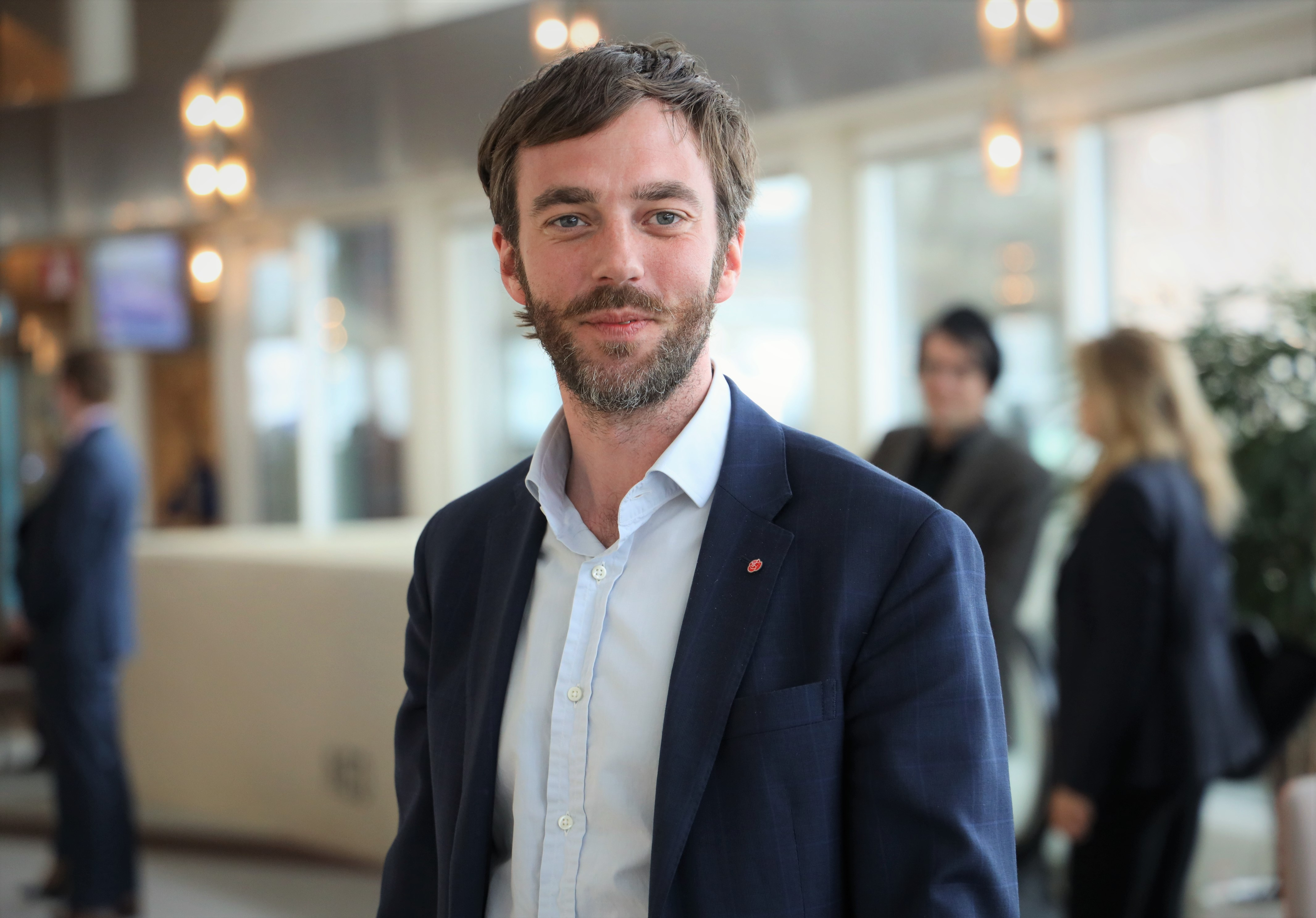
- Olsson in April 2021

Member of the Riksdag
- Incumbent
- Assumed office 29 September 2014
- Constituency: Jämtland County

Personal details
- Born: Kalle Olsson; 1984 (age 41–42)
- Party: Social Democratic Party
- Education: Stockholm University

Kalle Olsson (born 1984) is a Swedish politician, journalist and member of the Riksdag, the national legislature. A member of the Social Democratic Party, he has represented Jämtland County since September 2014.

Olsson is the son of bus driver Ruben Olsson and the nurse Kajsa Olsson. He was educated in Östersund. He studied political science at the Mid Sweden University and Stockholm University. He has worked as a cleaner and a lifeguard at the swimming pool in Östersund. He was a sports reporter at the Östersunds-Posten and political editor at the Länstidningen Östersund.
