= Saila Quicklund =

Swedish politician (born 1961)

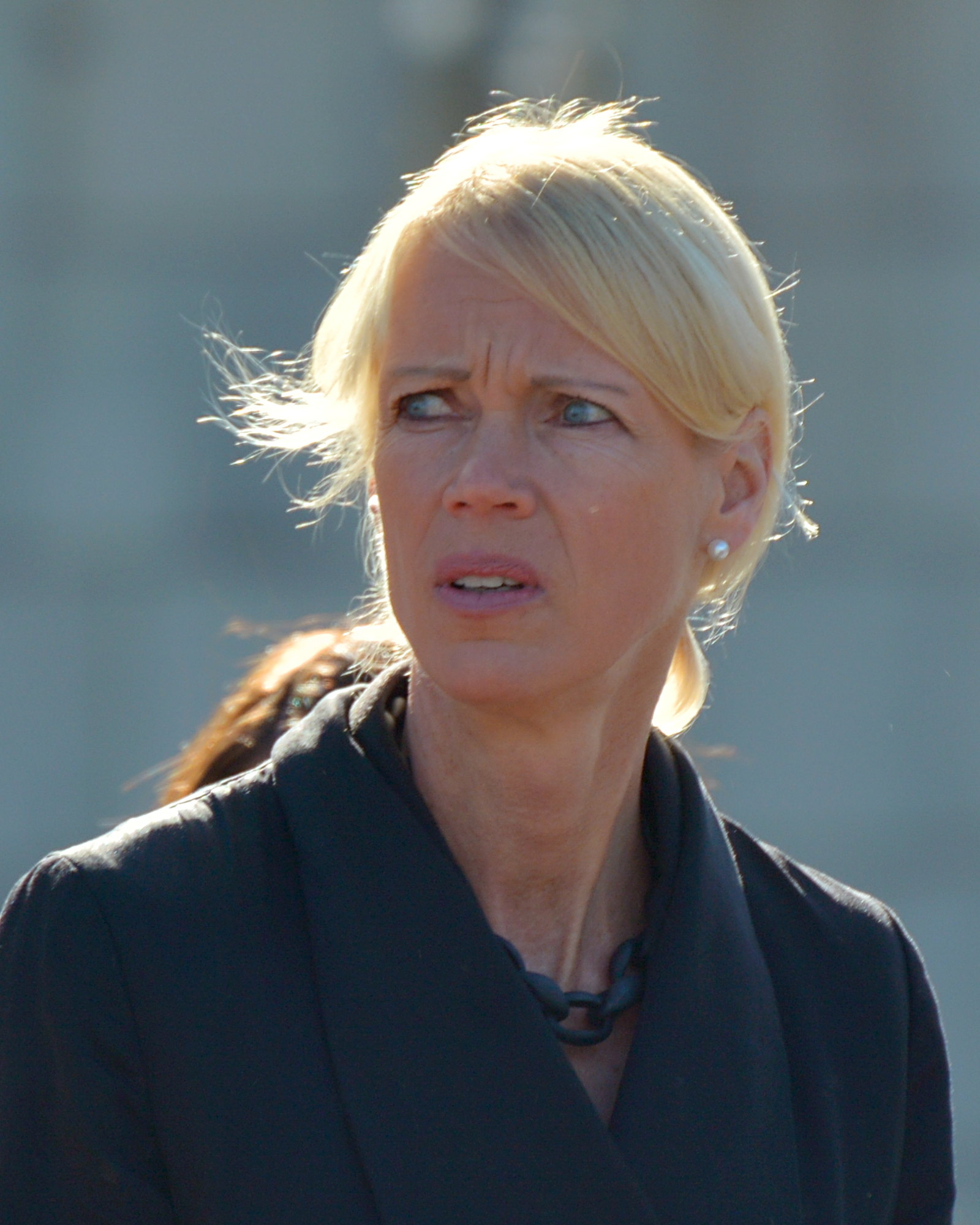

Member of the Riksdag
- In office 2010–2026
- Constituency: Jämtland County

Personal details
- Born: 31 October 1961 (age 64)
- Party: Moderate Party

Saila Quicklund (born 31 October 1961) is a Swedish politician from the Moderate Party. She was a member of the Riksdag from Jämtland County from 2010 to 2026.

== See also ==
- List of members of the Riksdag, 2010–2014
- List of members of the Riksdag, 2014–2018
- List of members of the Riksdag, 2018–2022
- List of members of the Riksdag, 2022–2026
- List of members of the Riksdag, 2026–2030
