= Gunnar Sandberg =

Swedish politician (born 1966)

Gunnar Sandberg (born 1966) is a Swedish social democratic politician who was a member of the Riksdag from 2003 to 2014.
