= Marie Nordén =

Swedish politician (born 1967)

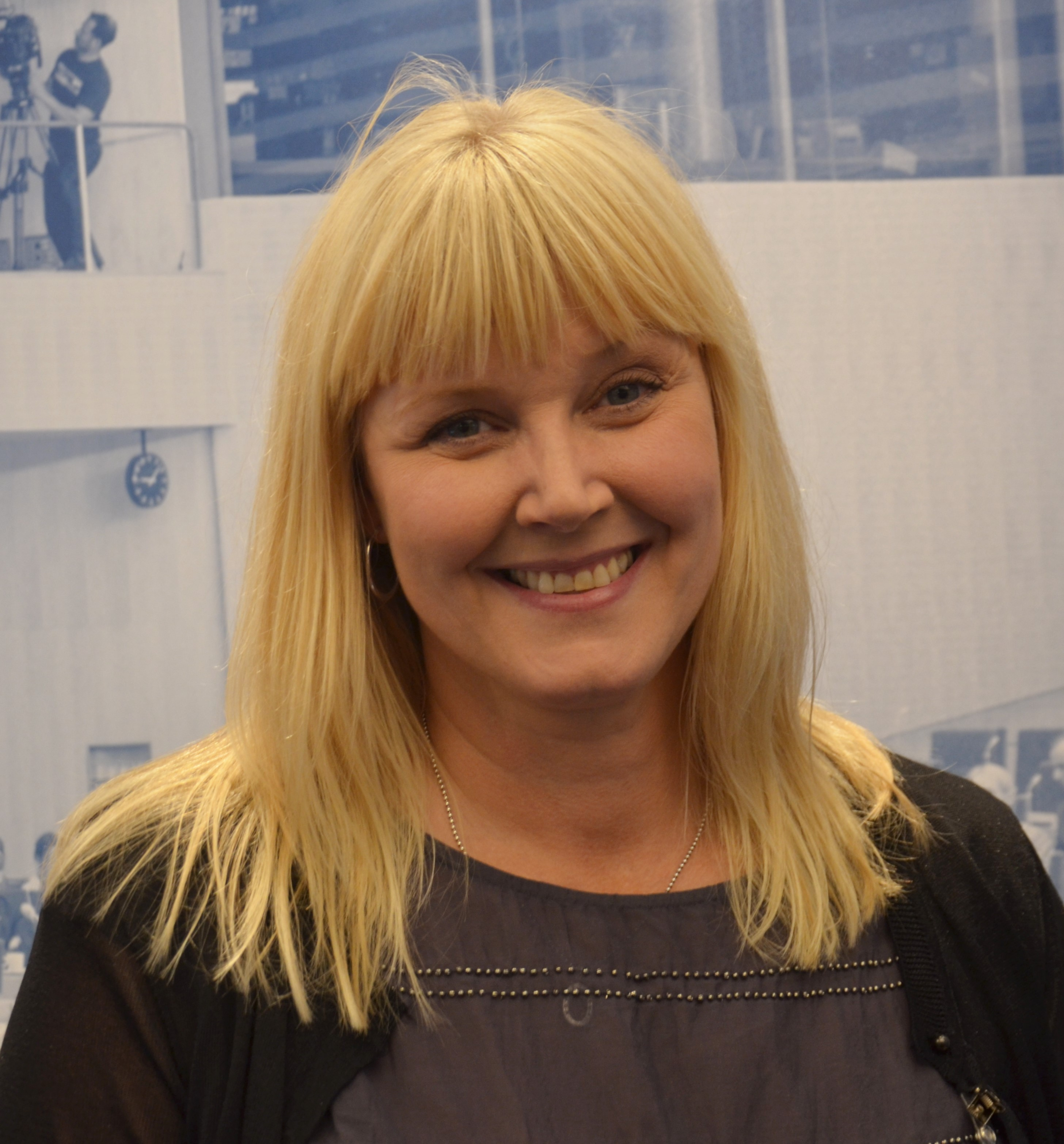
Marie Norden

Marie Nordén (born 1967) is a Swedish social democratic politician. She was a member of the Riksdag from 2006 until 2014.

In 2015, Nordén was appointed Secretary General for the National Society for Road Safety.
