= Per Åsling =

Swedish politician (born 1957)

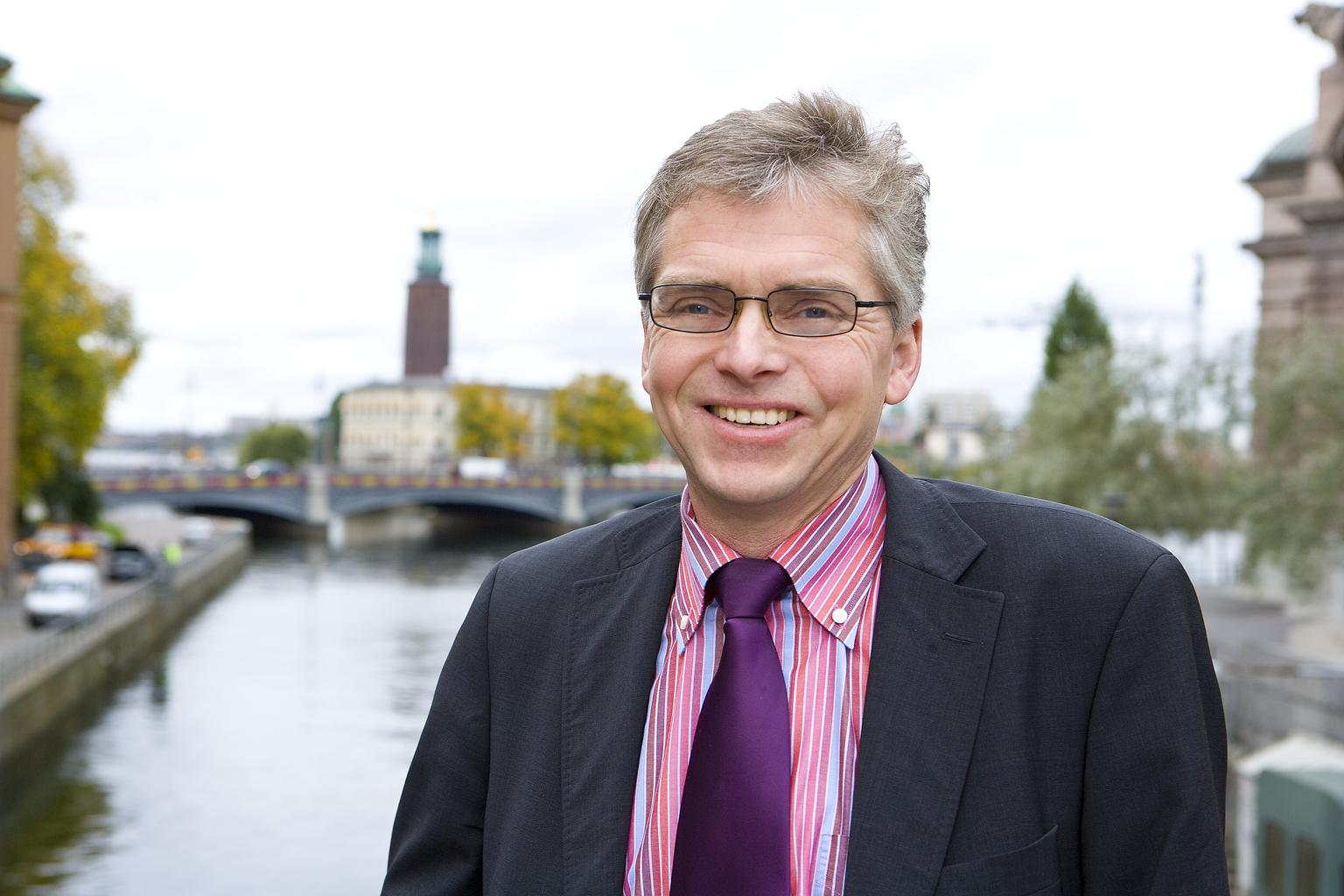

member of the Riksdag
- In office 2006–2022

Personal details
- Political party: Centre Party

Per "Pelle" Anders Håkan Åsling (born 12 February 1957 in Alsen, Jämtland) is a Swedish politician of the Centre Party. He was a member of the Riksdag from 2006 to 2022.

He is the son of former industry minister Nils G. Åsling.
