= Ola Sundell =

Swedish politician

Ola Sundell (born March 19, 1952, Hammerdal) is a Swedish politician of the Moderate Party, and member of the Riksdag since 1994. Sundell has been the Moderate Party's spokesperson on Sámi issues.
