= Bo Toresson =

Swedish politician (born 1939)

Secretary General of Swedish Social Democratic Party
- In office 1982–1992
- Preceded by: Sten Andersson
- Succeeded by: Mona Sahlin

Personal details
- Born: 1939 (age 86–87) Hunge, Bräcke Municipality, Sweden
- Party: Swedish Social Democratic Party

Bo Toresson (born 1939) is a Swedish Social Democrat politician who served as the secretary-general of the Swedish Social Democratic Party between 1982 and 1992. He also served at the Parliament.

== Biography ==
Toresson was born in Hunge, Bräcke municipality, in 1939. He started his career as a forest worker. He joined the Swedish Social Democratic Party in 1956. He was among the speech writers for Prime Ministers Tage Erlander and Olof Palme. Next he served as a local editor of a regional newspaper based in Bräcke.

In 1982 Toresson was appointed secretary general of the Social Democratic Party, replacing Sten Andersson in the post. Toresson's tenure ended in 1992 when Mona Sahlin was appointed as secretary general. He was a member of the Parliament in 1991. Then Toresson was appointed by the Social Democratic Party to the European Forum for Democracy and Solidarity which was established to assist the formation of democratic political parties in the former communist countries. The forum was based in Brussels, Belgium, and he remained in office until 1996. Toresson was elected as the chairman of the Swedish Hunters' Association shortly after his return to Sweden in 1996 and held the post until 2003.
