= Court Districts of Sweden =

Court districts in Sweden divide Norrland which was never divided into hundreds and instead the court districts, or tingslag, served as the basic division of these rural areas.

== Tingslag ==
- Lits Court District in Jämtland
- Hede Court District in Härjedalen
- Umeå Court District in Västerbotten
