= Norr-Hede =

- Location within Jämtland Location within Sweden
- Coordinates: 62°25′N 13°32′E
- Country: Sweden
- Province: Härjedalen
- County: Jämtland County
- Municipality: Härjedalen Municipality

Area
  - Total: 0.79 km^{2} (0.31 sq mi)

Population (31 December 2010)
  - Total: 261
  - Density: 328/km^{2} (850/sq mi)
- Time zone: UTC+1 (CET)
  - Summer (DST): UTC+2 (CEST)

Norr-Hede is a locality situated in Härjedalen Municipality, Jämtland County, Sweden with 261 inhabitants in 2010.
