= Lillhärdal =

- Location within Jämtland Location within Sweden
- Coordinates: 61°51′N 14°04′E
- Country: Sweden
- Province: Härjedalen
- County: Jämtland County
- Municipality: Härjedalen Municipality

Area
  - Total: 1.14 km^{2} (0.44 sq mi)

Population (31 December 2010)
  - Total: 850
  - Density: 293/km^{2} (760/sq mi)
- Time zone: UTC+1 (CET)
  - Summer (DST): UTC+2 (CEST)

Lillhärdal (Swedish pronunciation: [ˈlɪ̂lːˌhæːɖal]) is a locality situated in Härjedalen Municipality, Jämtland County, Sweden, with 335 inhabitants in 2010. The village is located in the southern parts of Härjedalen, about 30 kilometers from Sveg.

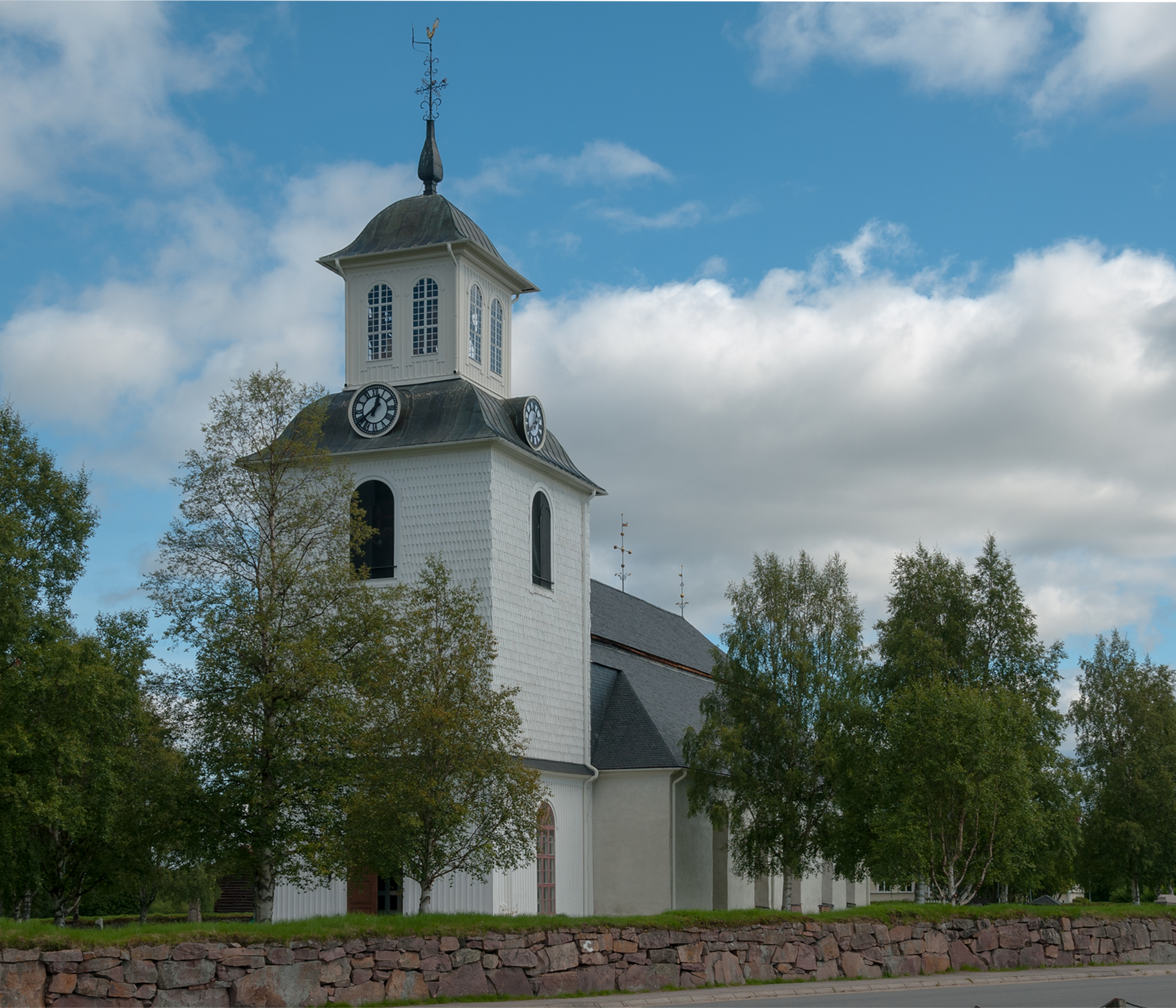
Lillhärdal Church

Lillhärdal Church (Lillhärdals kyrka) is associated with Svegsbygden parish in the Diocese of Härnösand. It is a wooden church building which was first built in 1407. An extension was made in 1770–1771. The church was originally equipped with rococo decor, including an altarpiece and pulpit from 1774. A wooden church tower was built in 1805.

During the years 1831–32, Göran Sundin (1795–1857) performed painting and gilding of the stand and drapery painting behind the pulpit. The church underwent restoration in 1880 with a major restoration in 1979.
