= Knatten =

Coordinates: 62°11′N 14°16′E

Knatten is a small village near Sveg, Sweden, which is in Härjedalen province. The name translates to foothills in English. It consists of a few dozen log cabins in a clearing in the forest set in the foothills of Knattenberget.
