= Lofsdalen =

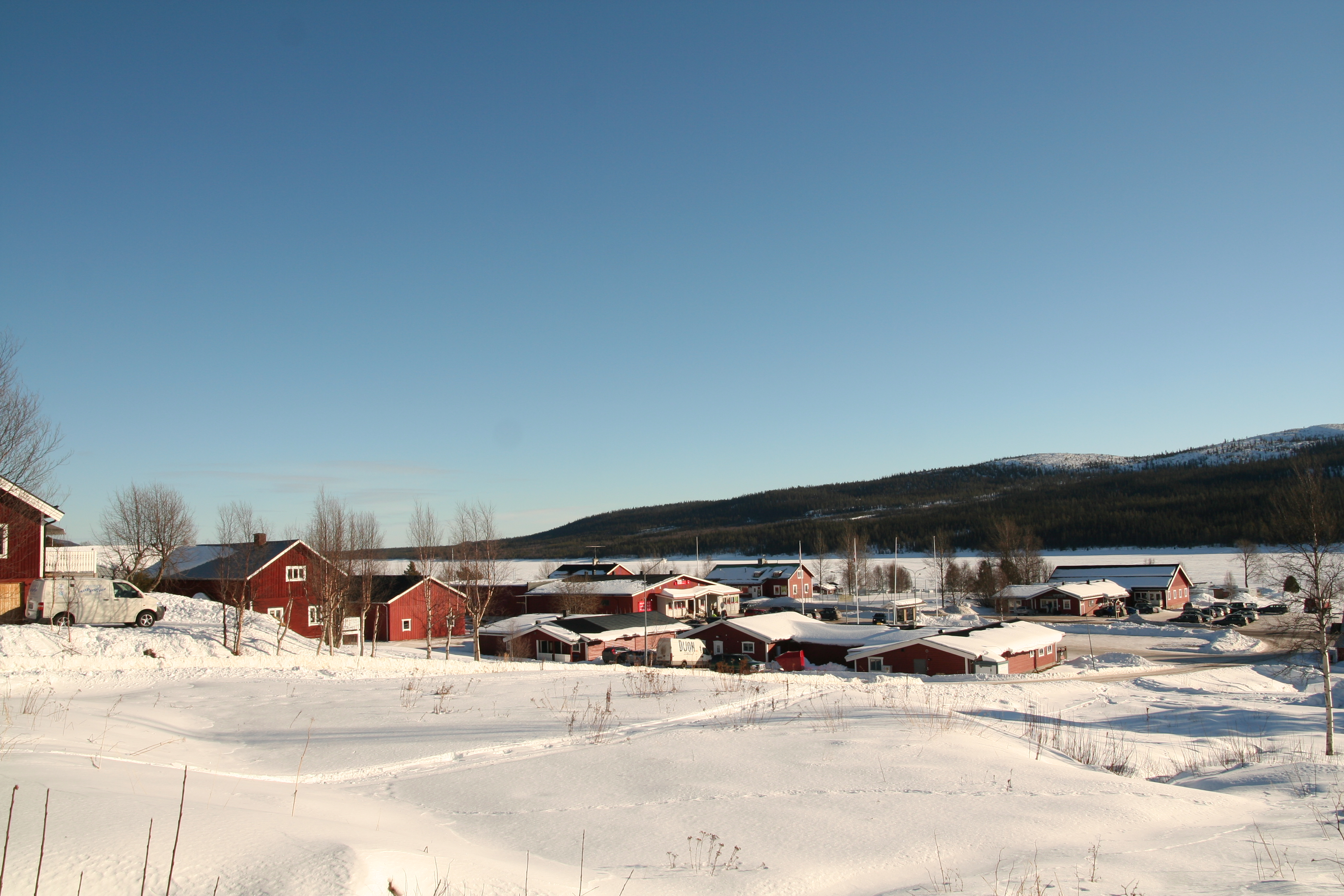
- View from Lofsdalen towards Lake Lofssjön

- Location within Sweden
- Coordinates: 62°007′N 13°016′E
- Country: Sweden
- County: Jämtland
- Municipality: Härjedalen
- Time zone: UTC+1 (CET)
  - Summer (DST): UTC+2 (CEST)

Lofsdalen (Swedish pronunciation: [ˈlɔ̂fːsˌdɑːlɛn]) is a village and ski resort located in the district of Linsell in Härjedalen Municipality, Sweden.

Lofsdalen is situated in the south of Härjedalen on the north side of Lake Lofssjön. In 1880, a road began to be broken between Linsell and Glöte, and the following year extended to Lofsdalen. From 1900 to 1901, a new highway was built between Linsell and Glöte. In 1931 the final stretch of road between Glöte and Lofsdalen was completed. In 1923, a road connection was made west to Högvålen.

Traditionality associated with fishing and hunting, Lofsdalen was developed during the mid 20th century as a ski destination offering alpine skiing, cross-country skiing trails and downhill runs.

In the Lofsdalen village there are a total of 170 constant inhabitants. Whereas in the whole Lofsdalen area there are 262 inhabitants.
