= Ulvkälla =

- Location within Jämtland Location within Sweden
- Coordinates: 62°01′N 14°21′E
- Country: Sweden
- Province: Härjedalen
- County: Jämtland County
- Municipality: Härjedalen Municipality

Area
  - Total: 0.95 km^{2} (0.37 sq mi)

Population (31 December 2010)
  - Total: 456
  - Density: 482/km^{2} (1,250/sq mi)
- Time zone: UTC+1 (CET)
  - Summer (DST): UTC+2 (CEST)

Ulvkälla is a locality situated in Härjedalen Municipality, Jämtland County, Sweden with 456 inhabitants in 2010.
