= Marcus Högström =

Swedish ice hockey player (born 1989)

- Born: March 20, 1989 (age 37) Sveg, Sweden
- Height: 6 ft 3 in (191 cm)
- Weight: 203 lb (92 kg; 14 st 7 lb)
- Position: Defence
- Shot: Left
- Played for: Skellefteå AIK; Timrå IK; Djurgårdens IF; Spartak Moscow; HIFK; Stockton Heat
- National team: Sweden
- NHL draft: Undrafted
- Playing career: 2008–2022

Marcus Högström (born March 20, 1989) is a Swedish former professional ice hockey defenceman who played in the Swedish Hockey League (SHL).

== Playing career ==
Högström played in the youth set-ups of Svegs IK, Skellefteå AIK and MODO Hockey. He then spent the 2009-10 campaign with Molot-Prikamie Perm in Russia's second-tier league. He made his Elitserien debut playing with Skellefteå AIK during the 2010–11 Elitserien season and would jump between Sweden's top-flight and the second division HockeyAllsvenskan in the following years, playing for clubs like Timrå IK, IF Sundsvall Hockey, Malmö Redhawks, Almtuna IS and Djurgårdens IF.

After two full seasons with Djurgårdens IF in the Elitserie, he left for the Kontinental Hockey League (KHL) in 2016, joining HC Spartak Moscow. He was waived by the KHL side in late November 2016 and accepted an offer from Finnish Liiga outfit HIFK a couple of days later.

During his second stint with Djurgårdens IF, and amid a successful 2017–18 season, Högström was signed to a three-year contract extension through to 2022 on February 7, 2018. As Djurgårdens reached the semi-finals, Högström contributed with 3 goals and 23 points in 50 regular season games.

On June 12, 2018, Högström sought a release from his contract with Djurgårdens IF after securing a one-year, two-way contract as a 29-year-old with the Calgary Flames of the National Hockey League (NHL). In his debut 2018–19 North American season, after attending the Flames training camp, Högström was assigned to American Hockey League affiliate, the Stockton Heat. Högström's season was cut short, contributing 2 assists in 12 games before he was ruled out with injury.

As an impending free agent from the Flames, Högström opted for a return to Sweden in rejoining Djurgårdens IF of the SHL on a two-year contract on May 10, 2019.

== International play ==
Högström received his first cap for Sweden's men's national team in April 2016.

== Career statistics ==
			Regular season					Playoffs
Season	Team	League	GP	G	A	Pts	PIM	GP	G	A	Pts	PIM
2003–04	Svegs IK	Div.3	13	3	0	3	12	—	—	—	—	—
2004–05	Svegs IK	Div.3	19	0	4	4	30	6	0	0	0	18
2006–07	Skellefteå AIK	J20	28	0	1	1	55	—	—	—	—	—
2007–08	Modo Hockey	J20	39	5	12	17	70	5	1	1	2	4
2007–08	AIK Härnösand	Div.1	2	2	2	4	4	—	—	—	—	—
2008–09	Modo Hockey	J20	29	5	14	19	36	5	2	0	2	4
2008–09	KB65 HK	Div.1	3	0	0	0	0	—	—	—	—	—
2009–10	Molot-Prikamie Perm	RUS2	35	1	10	11	18	10	0	2	2	4
2009–10	Molot Perm	RUS3	2	0	2	2	4	—	—	—	—	—
2010–11	Skellefteå AIK	SEL	1	0	0	0	0	—	—	—	—	—
2010–11	IF Sundsvall Hockey	Allsv	44	6	23	29	95	—	—	—	—	—
2010–11	Timrå IK	SEL	2	0	0	0	2	—	—	—	—	—
2011–12	Timrå IK	SEL	30	0	6	6	8	—	—	—	—	—
2011–12	IF Sundsvall Hockey	Allsv	6	1	3	4	27	—	—	—	—	—
2011–12	Malmö Redhawks	Allsv	16	3	0	3	14	6	0	1	1	4
2012–13	Asplöven HC	Allsv	7	2	2	4	6	—	—	—	—	—
2012–13	IF Sundsvall Hockey	Div.1	14	2	9	11	32	3	0	2	2	16
2012–13	Svegs IK	Div.2	2	2	3	5	30	—	—	—	—	—
2013–14	Almtuna IS	Allsv	47	5	22	27	36	—	—	—	—	—
2013–14	Djurgårdens IF	Allsv	3	0	1	1	4	10	2	9	11	4
2014–15	Djurgårdens IF	SHL	53	6	13	19	30	2	0	0	0	0
2015–16	Djurgårdens IF	SHL	50	8	20	28	56	8	2	1	3	12
2016–17	Spartak Moscow	KHL	30	1	7	8	20	—	—	—	—	—
2016–17	HIFK	Liiga	11	0	2	2	8	—	—	—	—	—
2016–17	Djurgårdens IF	SHL	21	2	9	11	0	3	0	2	2	0
2017–18	Djurgårdens IF	SHL	50	3	20	23	38	11	1	6	7	31
2018–19	Stockton Heat	AHL	12	0	2	2	6	—	—	—	—	—
2019–20	Djurgårdens IF	SHL	50	7	19	26	22	—	—	—	—	—
2020–21	Djurgårdens IF	SHL	43	2	14	16	55	3	0	0	0	2
2021–22	Djurgårdens IF	SHL	8	2	2	4	2	—	—	—	—	—
SHL totals			308	30	103	133	213	27	3	9	12	45
