= Härjedalen Municipality =

Härjedalen Municipality Härjedalens kommun
- Municipality
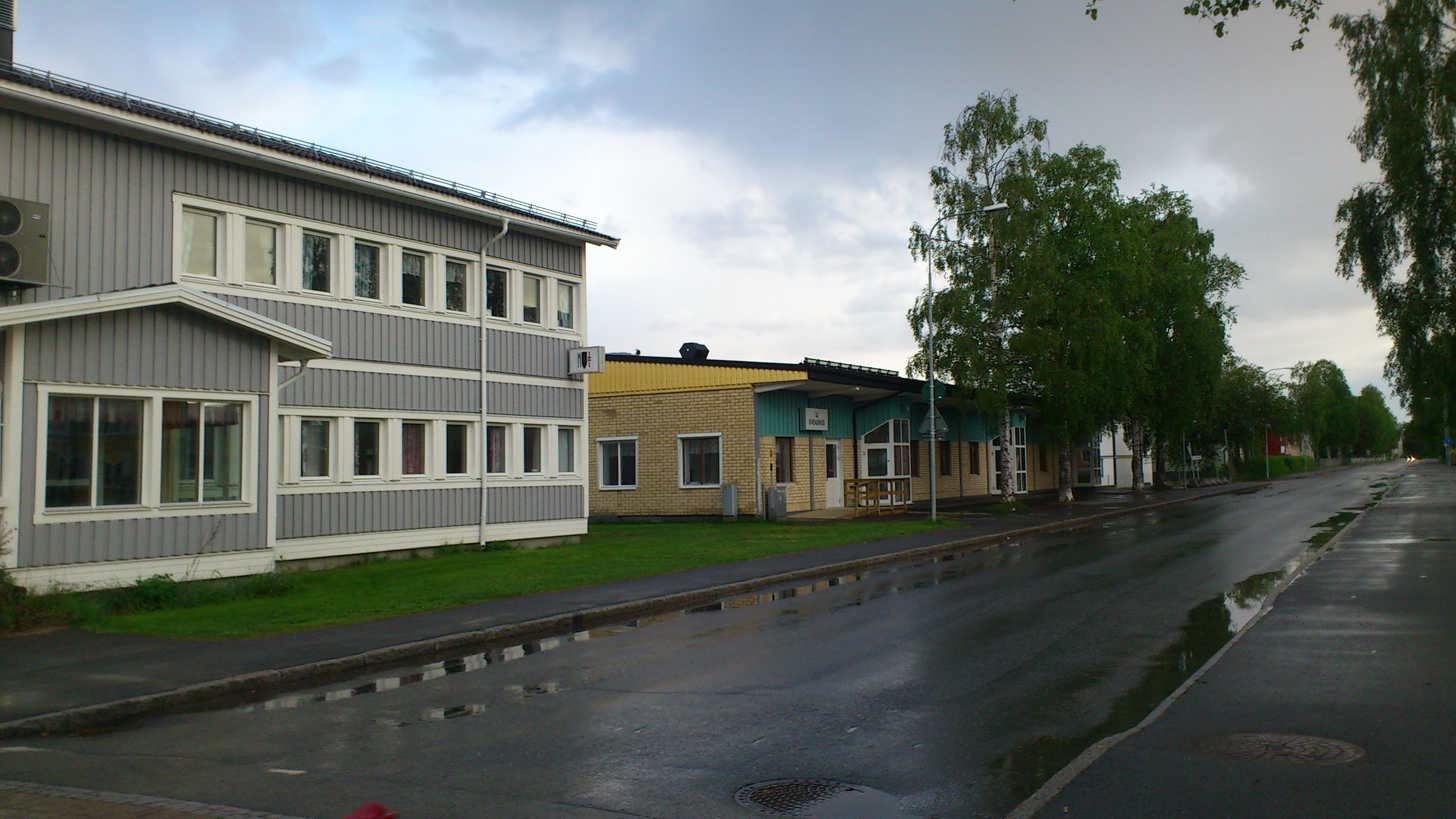
- Härjedalen town hall

- Flag Coat of arms

- Coordinates: 62°02′N 14°21′E
- Country: Sweden
- County: Jämtland County
- Seat: Sveg

Area
  - Total: 11,859.62 km^{2} (4,579.02 sq mi)
  - Land: 11,286.1 km^{2} (4,357.6 sq mi)
  - Water: 573.52 km^{2} (221.44 sq mi)
- Area as of 1 January 2014.

Population (30 June 2025)
  - Total: 10,129
  - Density: 0.89748/km^{2} (2.3245/sq mi)
- Time zone: UTC+1 (CET)
  - Summer (DST): UTC+2 (CEST)
- ISO 3166 code: SE
- Province: Härjedalen, Hälsingland and Dalarna
- Municipal code: 2361
- Website: www.herjedalen.se

Härjedalen Municipality (Swedish: Härjedalens kommun, Southern Sami: Herjedaelien tjïelte) is a municipality in Jämtland County in northern Sweden. Its seat is located in Sveg.

The municipality roughly, but not exactly, corresponds with the traditional province Härjedalen.

The municipality was created in 1974 and is one of two in Sweden with the name of a province (Gotland Municipality is the other). It consists of nine original local government entities (as of 1863).

== Geography ==
With a total area of 11,935 square kilometres (4,608 sq mi), it is Sweden's fifth largest. However, it is largely wilderness, and the municipality is sparsely inhabited. For comparison, the municipality covers as much territory as Uppsala County and Stockholm County combined, but those two counties have over 2,000,000 inhabitants.

=== Localities ===
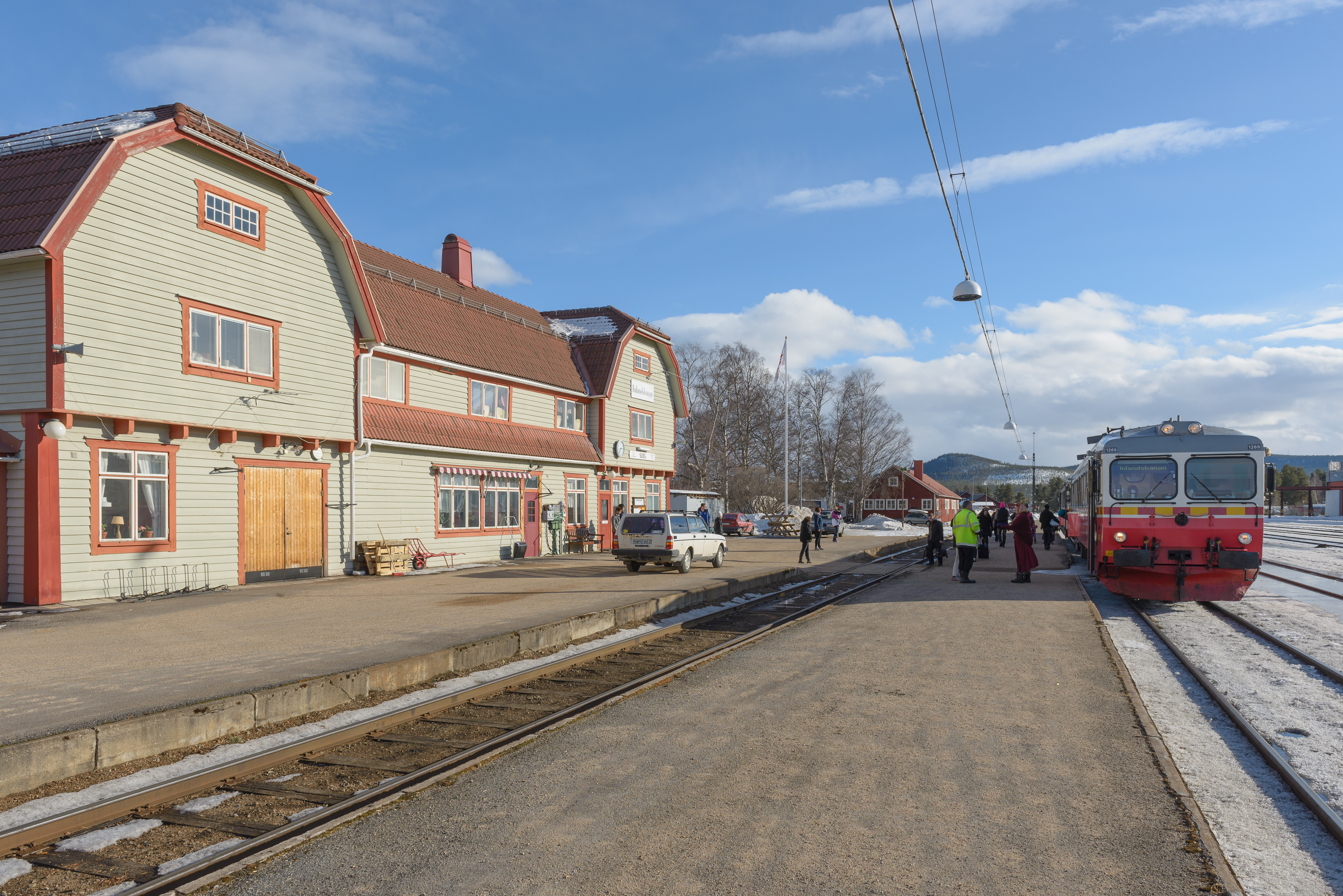
Sveg railway station.

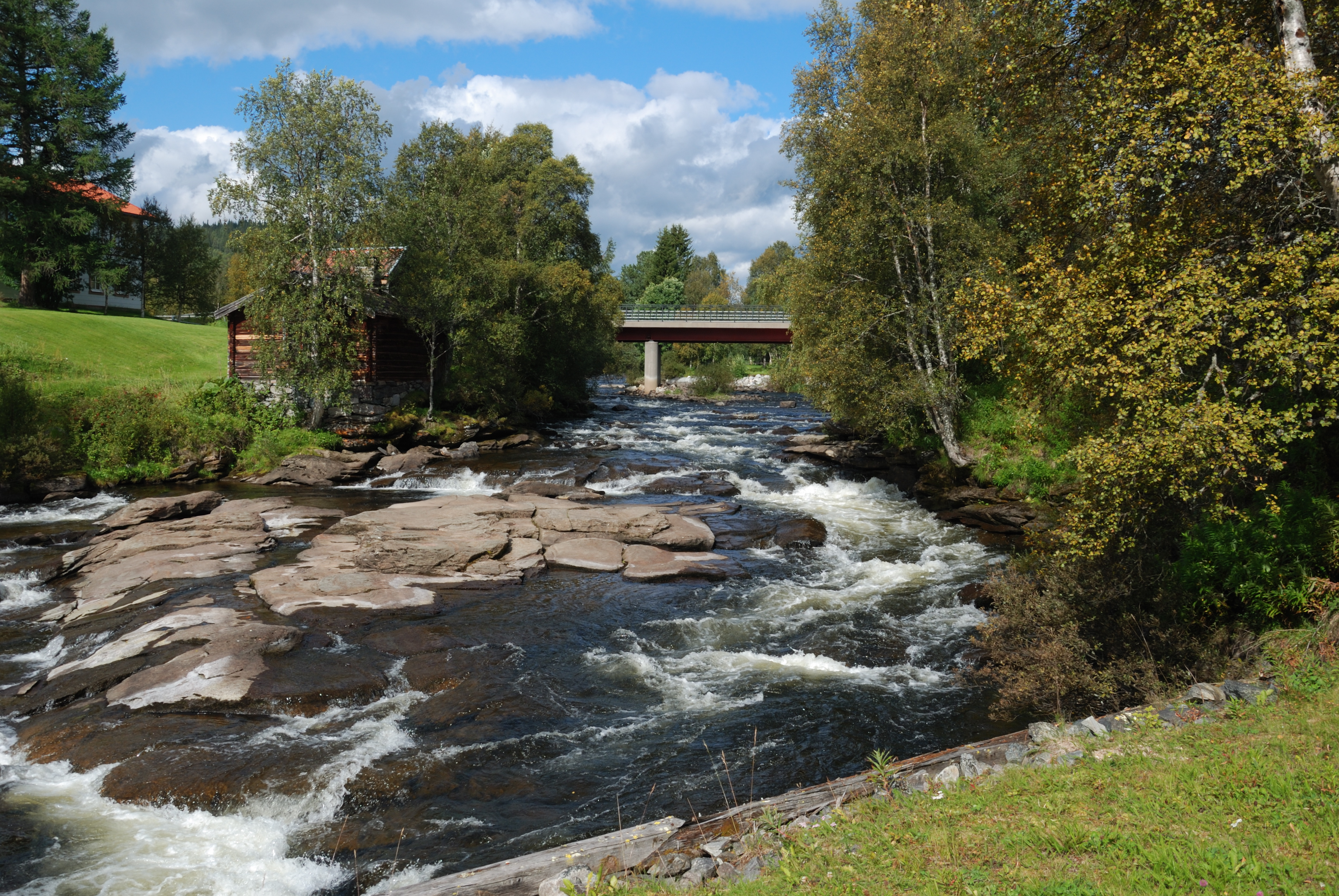
Ljusnan River

There are eight localities (or urban areas) in Härjedalen Municipality:

#	Locality	Population
1	**Sveg**	2,633
2	Funäsdalen	798
3	Hede	763
4	Ytterhogdal	603
5	Vemdalen	547
6	Ulvkälla	445
7	Lillhärdal	365
8	Norr-Hede	293

The municipal seat in bold

== Demographics ==
This is a demographic table based on Härjedalen Municipality's electoral districts in the 2022 Swedish general election sourced from SVT's election platform, in turn taken from SCB official statistics.

In total there were 8,125 Swedish citizens of voting age resident in the municipality. 50.0% voted for the left coalition and 48.7% for the right coalition. Indicators are in percentage points except population totals and income.

Location	Residents	Citizen adults	Left vote	Right vote	Employed	Swedish parents	Foreign heritage	Income SEK	Degree
Location			%	%					
Funäsdalen	2,261	1,797	53.1	45.5	84	88	12	25,000	37
Hede-Vemdalen	2,282	1,901	49.1	49.7	86	90	10	24,067	28
Lillhärdal-Ängersjö	1,327	1,094	41.5	56.7	81	92	8	22,506	24
Sveg-Glöte	2,095	1,587	47.1	51.1	80	81	19	22,281	27
Sveg-Ytterhogdal	2,143	1,746	55.4	43.9	78	85	15	21,092	22
Source: SVT

== Riksdag ==
This table lists the national results since the 1972 Swedish municipality reform. The results of the Sweden Democrats from 1988 to 1998 were not published by the SCB at a municipal level due to the party's small size nationally at the time.

Year	Turnout	Votes	V	S	MP	C	L	KD	M	SD	ND
1973	85.8	8,298	5.4	55.6	0.0	25.3	6.1	1.1	5.4	0.0	0.0
1976	87.3	8,768	4.6	56.5	0.0	26.2	5.7	1.1	5.6	0.0	0.0
1979	86.6	8,799	5.3	58.2	0.0	21.9	5.2	1.0	8.1	0.0	0.0
1982	87.3	8,828	5.3	59.1	1.1	18.5	3.5	1.1	11.3	0.0	0.0
1985	85.7	8,671	4.6	58.9	1.4	15.5	7.3	0.0	12.3	0.0	0.0
1988	81.1	8,007	6.1	56.8	4.9	14.1	7.5	1.3	9.1	0.0	0.0
1991	83.0	8,059	4.9	51.2	2.7	12.8	5.5	3.0	12.1	0.0	6.2
1994	82.9	8,024	7.2	58.1	5.0	10.9	3.9	1.7	11.8	0.0	0.7
1998	77.4	7,129	17.0	46.8	3.9	8.1	2.8	6.7	12.8	0.0	0.0
2002	74.8	6,650	12.1	50.2	3.6	11.5	6.0	4.6	9.7	0.3	0.0
2006	77.6	6,613	8.2	45.7	2.3	12.9	4.7	3.8	17.2	2.7	0.0
2010	80.6	6,739	6.0	44.6	3.8	9.4	3.8	2.3	22.2	7.0	0.0
2014	82.8	6,765	5.2	42.9	3.0	10.5	2.1	1.9	17.2	15.2	0.0

Blocs

This lists the relative strength of the socialist and centre-right blocs since 1973, but parties not elected to the Riksdag are inserted as "other", including the Sweden Democrats results from 1988 to 2006, but also the Christian Democrats pre-1991 and the Greens in 1982, 1985 and 1991. The sources are identical to the table above. The coalition or government mandate marked in bold formed the government after the election. New Democracy got elected in 1991 but are still listed as "other" due to the short lifespan of the party. "Elected" is the total number of percentage points from the municipality that went to parties who were elected to the Riksdag.

Year	Turnout	Votes	Left	Right	SD	Other	Elected
1973	85.8	8,298	**61.0**	36.8	0.0	2.2	97.8
1976	87.3	8,768	60.1	**37.5**	0.0	2.4	97.6
1979	86.6	8,799	63.5	**35.2**	0.0	1.3	98.7
1982	87.3	8,828	**64.4**	33.3	0.0	2.3	97.7
1985	85.7	8,671	**63.5**	35.1	0.0	1.4	98.6
1988	81.1	8,007	**67.8**	30.7	0.0	1.5	98.5
1991	83.0	8,059	56.1	**33.4**	0.0	10.5	95.7
1994	82.9	8,024	**70.3**	26.6	0.0	3.1	96.9
1998	77.4	7,129	**67.7**	30.4	0.0	1.9	98.1
2002	74.8	6,650	**65.9**	31.8	0.0	2.3	97.7
2006	77.6	6,613	56.2	**38.6**	0.0	5.2	94.8
2010	80.6	6,739	54.4	**37.7**	7.0	0.9	99.1
2014	82.8	6,765	**51.1**	31.7	15.2	2.0	98.0

== Notable natives ==
- Henning Mankell, author
- Anna Carin Zidek, sportsperson
- Marcus Högström, ice hockey professional
