= Hede, Sweden =

Hede
- Location within Jämtland Location within Sweden
- Coordinates: 62°25′N 13°31′E
- Country: Sweden
- Province: Härjedalen
- County: Jämtland County
- Municipality: Härjedalen Municipality

Area
  - Total: 1.63 km^{2} (0.63 sq mi)

Population (31 December 2010)
  - Total: 741
  - Density: 456/km^{2} (1,180/sq mi)
- Time zone: UTC+1 (CET)
  - Summer (DST): UTC+2 (CEST)

Hede is a locality situated in Härjedalen Municipality, Jämtland County, Sweden with 741 inhabitants in 2010. The river Ljusnan runs through the village. The forest around Hede have supported a number of sawmills and paper mills. Sonfjället National Park and the Vemdalen ski resort are located a short distance from the village.

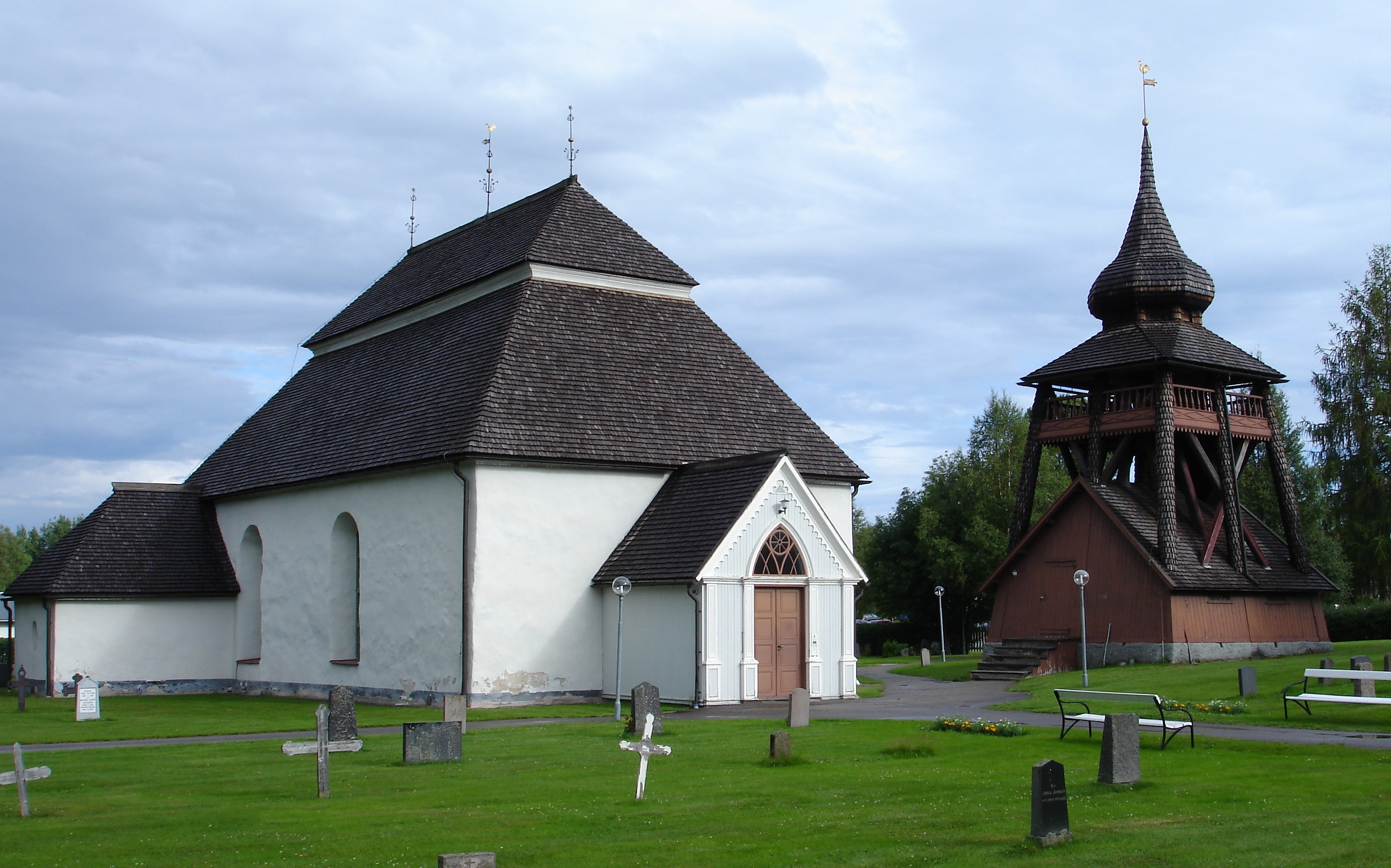
Hede Church

Hede is the site of Hede Church (Hede kyrka) and the parish of Hede in Diocese of Härnösand. The first wooden church was built in 1613. The present stone church was built in neo-Gothic style in 1890. The church has whitewashed walls and is covered by manor roofing that is clad with wood shavings. South of the church is a freestanding, wooden onion dome bell tower built in 1751. The altarpiece was painted by Pehr Sundin (1760–1827). The pulpit was carved by Jöns Ljungberg (1736–1818).

== Climate ==
Climate data for Hede 1991−2020 normals (430m)
Month	Jan	Feb	Mar	Apr	May	Jun	Jul	Aug	Sep	Oct	Nov	Dec	Year
Record high °C (°F)	8.4 (47.1)	8.1 (46.6)	13.1 (55.6)	20.1 (68.2)	25.7 (78.3)	30.0 (86.0)	30.5 (86.9)	27.5 (81.5)	24.0 (75.2)	18.3 (64.9)	10.8 (51.4)	6.9 (44.4)	30.5 (86.9)
Mean daily maximum °C (°F)	−4.3 (24.3)	−2.8 (27.0)	1.8 (35.2)	6.9 (44.4)	12.9 (55.2)	17.2 (63.0)	20.0 (68.0)	18.3 (64.9)	13.3 (55.9)	6.1 (43.0)	−0.1 (31.8)	−3.8 (25.2)	7.1 (44.8)
Daily mean °C (°F)	−9.7 (14.5)	−9.0 (15.8)	−4.5 (23.9)	1.2 (34.2)	6.6 (43.9)	11.0 (51.8)	13.7 (56.7)	12.0 (53.6)	7.6 (45.7)	1.4 (34.5)	−4.4 (24.1)	−8.8 (16.2)	1.4 (34.6)
Mean daily minimum °C (°F)	−14.8 (5.4)	−14.5 (5.9)	−10.7 (12.7)	−4.8 (23.4)	−0.1 (31.8)	4.6 (40.3)	7.5 (45.5)	6.0 (42.8)	2.3 (36.1)	−2.8 (27.0)	−8.3 (17.1)	−13.6 (7.5)	−4.1 (24.6)
Record low °C (°F)	−38.7 (−37.7)	−41.9 (−43.4)	−36.0 (−32.8)	−23.2 (−9.8)	−13.6 (7.5)	−6.0 (21.2)	−2.0 (28.4)	−4.2 (24.4)	−8.6 (16.5)	−26.0 (−14.8)	−33.7 (−28.7)	−37.2 (−35.0)	−41.9 (−43.4)
Average precipitation mm (inches)	30.2 (1.19)	21.9 (0.86)	21.5 (0.85)	25.1 (0.99)	46.1 (1.81)	68.5 (2.70)	86.8 (3.42)	80.7 (3.18)	43.4 (1.71)	49.4 (1.94)	39.1 (1.54)	31.0 (1.22)	543.7 (21.41)
Source: SMHI
