= Härjulf Hornbrytare =

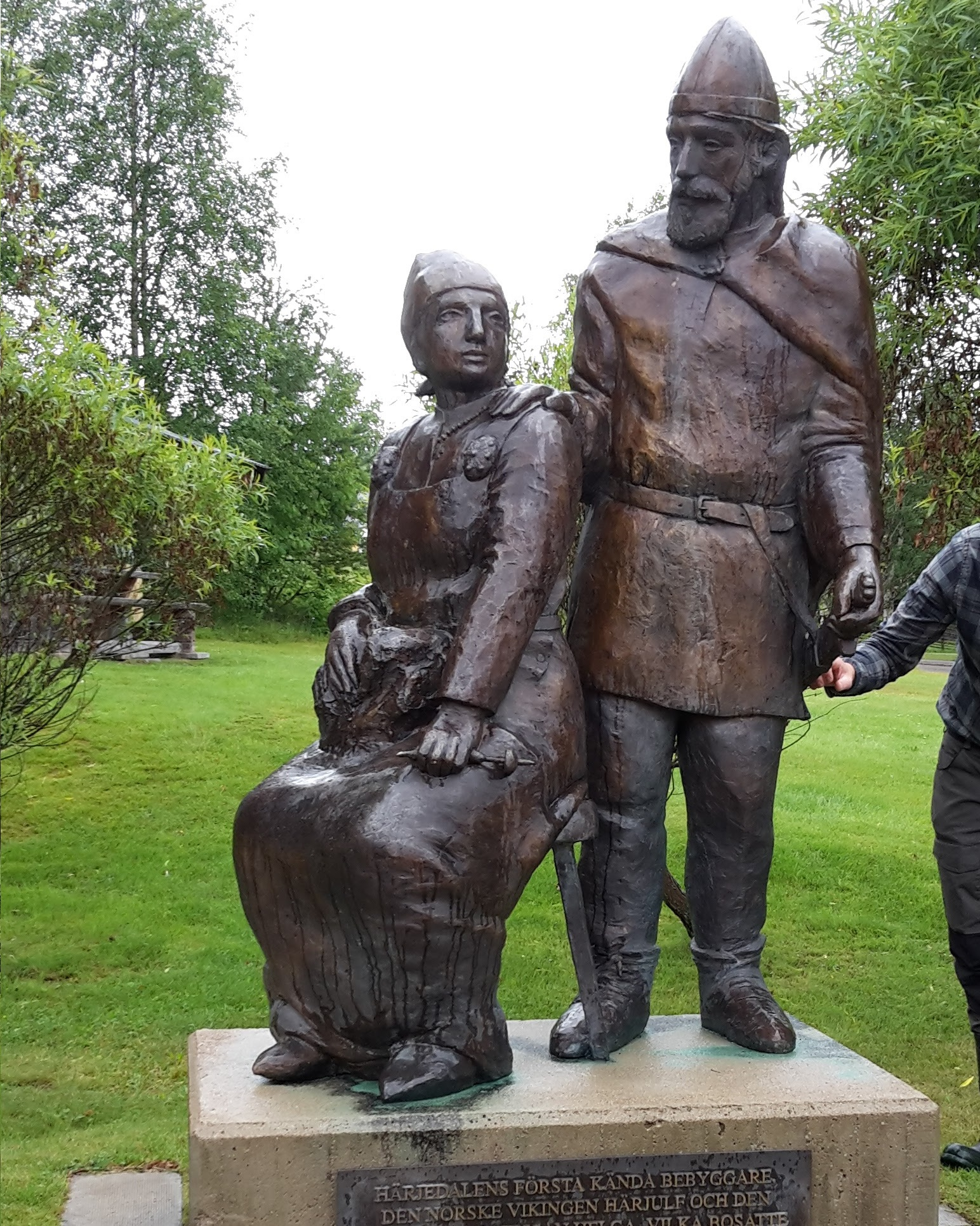
Statue of Härjulf Hornbrytare and his wife Helga in Lillhärdal.

Härjulf Hornbrytra was a Norwegian believed to have lived in the 8th century. He was the main character in "Härjulfssagan", which tells how Härjedalen got its first permanent settlement. The name Härjulf is inextricably linked with Härjedalen, and it is also claimed that the landscape is named after this burnt Viking.
