= Högvålen =

Coordinates: 62°16′N 12°56′E

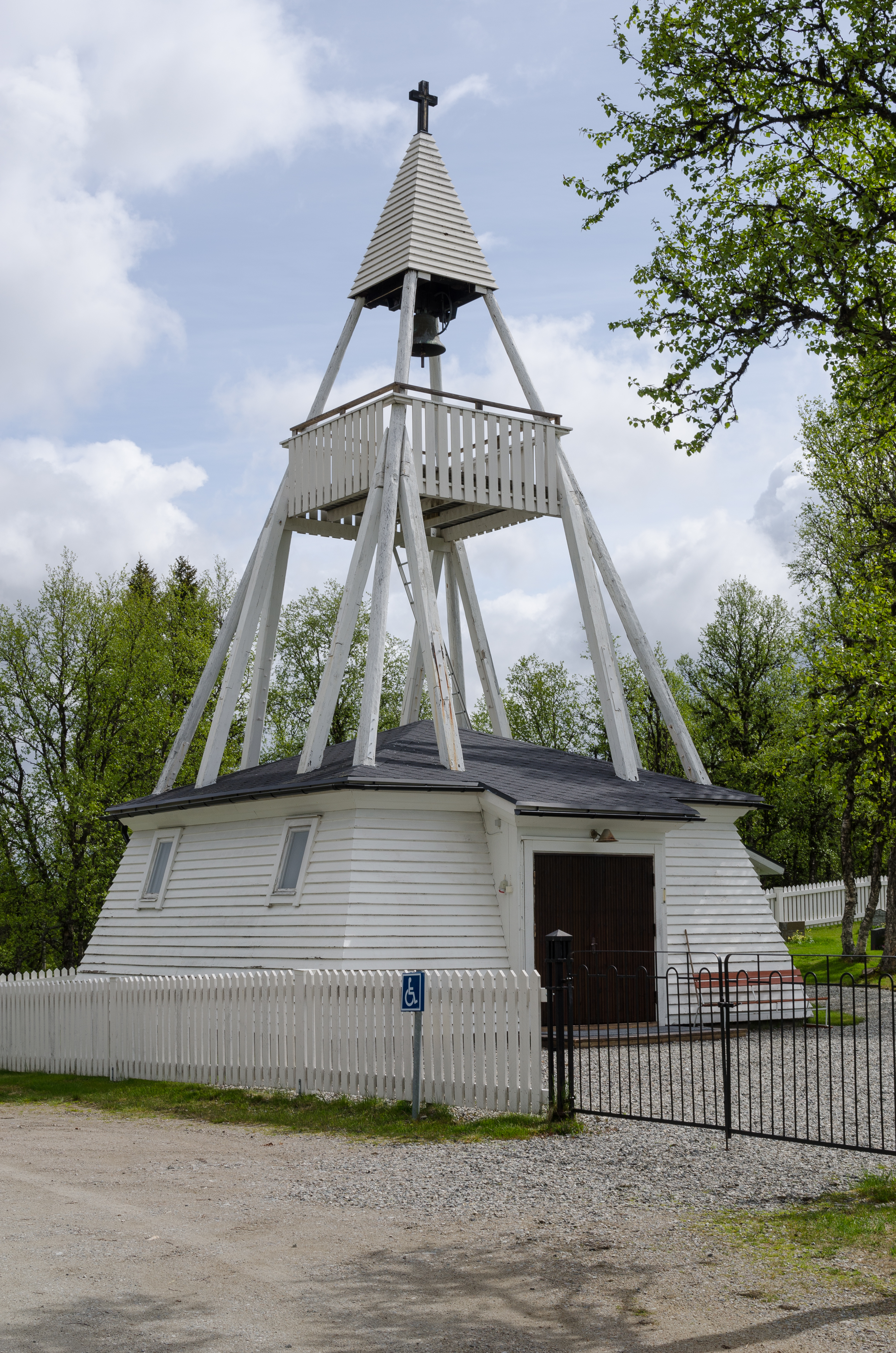
Högvålen Chapel

Högvålen is a village near Tännäs in the Härjedalen province of Sweden. At 835 metres (2,740 ft) above sea level, it is Sweden's highest continuously inhabited place. There have been at most around 100 inhabitants, but now only a few people live there. Högvålen is surrounded by mountains and big mires. According to Swedish statistics, it is not officially a village/locality (requires at least 200 people) nor a minor village/locality (requires at least 50 people).

It is the site of Högvålen Chapel (Högvålens kapell). The wooden chapel was inaugurated on 8 September 1960. It is associated with the parish of Tännäs-Ljusnedal in the Diocese of Härnösand.
