= Sveg =

Sveg, Sweden
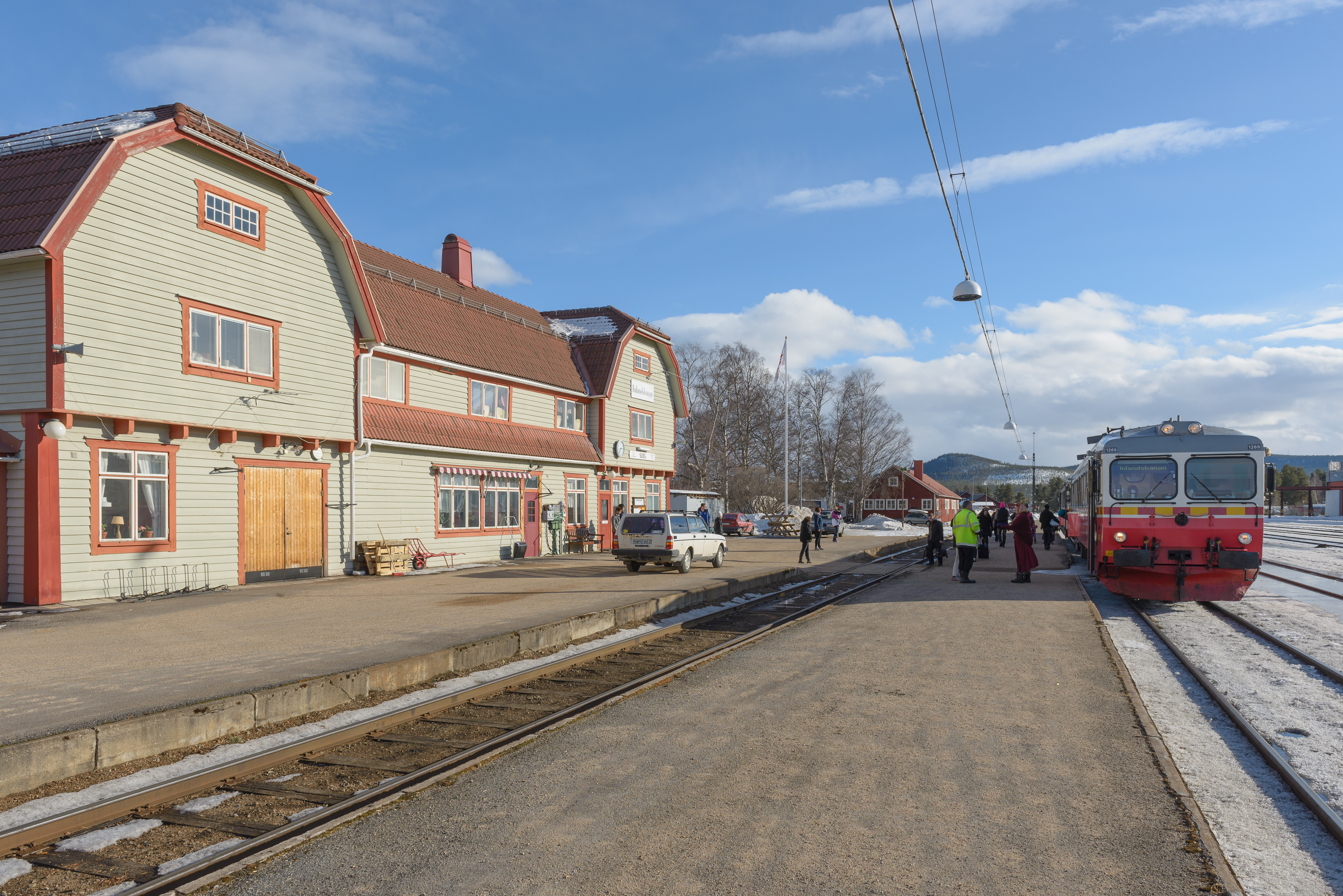
- Sveg railway station

- Location within Jämtland Location within Sweden
- Coordinates: 62°02′N 14°21′E
- Country: Sweden
- Province: Härjedalen
- County: Jämtland County
- Municipality: Härjedalen Municipality

Area
  - Total: 2.85 km^{2} (1.10 sq mi)

Population (31 December 2010)
  - Total: 2,547
  - Density: 895/km^{2} (2,320/sq mi)
- Time zone: UTC+1 (CET)
  - Summer (DST): UTC+2 (CEST)

Sveg (Swedish pronunciation: [ˈsveːɡ]) is a locality and the seat of Härjedalen Municipality in Jämtland County, Sweden, with 2,547 inhabitants in 2010.

== Overview ==
Sveg is the largest urban area in Härjedalen and the fourth largest in the county of Jämtland. The Ljusnan river flows through the city. Sveg is located on Riksväg 84 which runs from Hudiksvall in Gävleborg County to the Norwegian border where it connects with Fylkesvei 31 providing a route to Røros.

The addition of railway lines, Orsa–Svegs Järnväg between Orsa and Sveg in 1909 together with connection line from Sveg to Brunflo in 1922 and between Sveg and Hede in 1924, supported the development of large forest companies in the area.

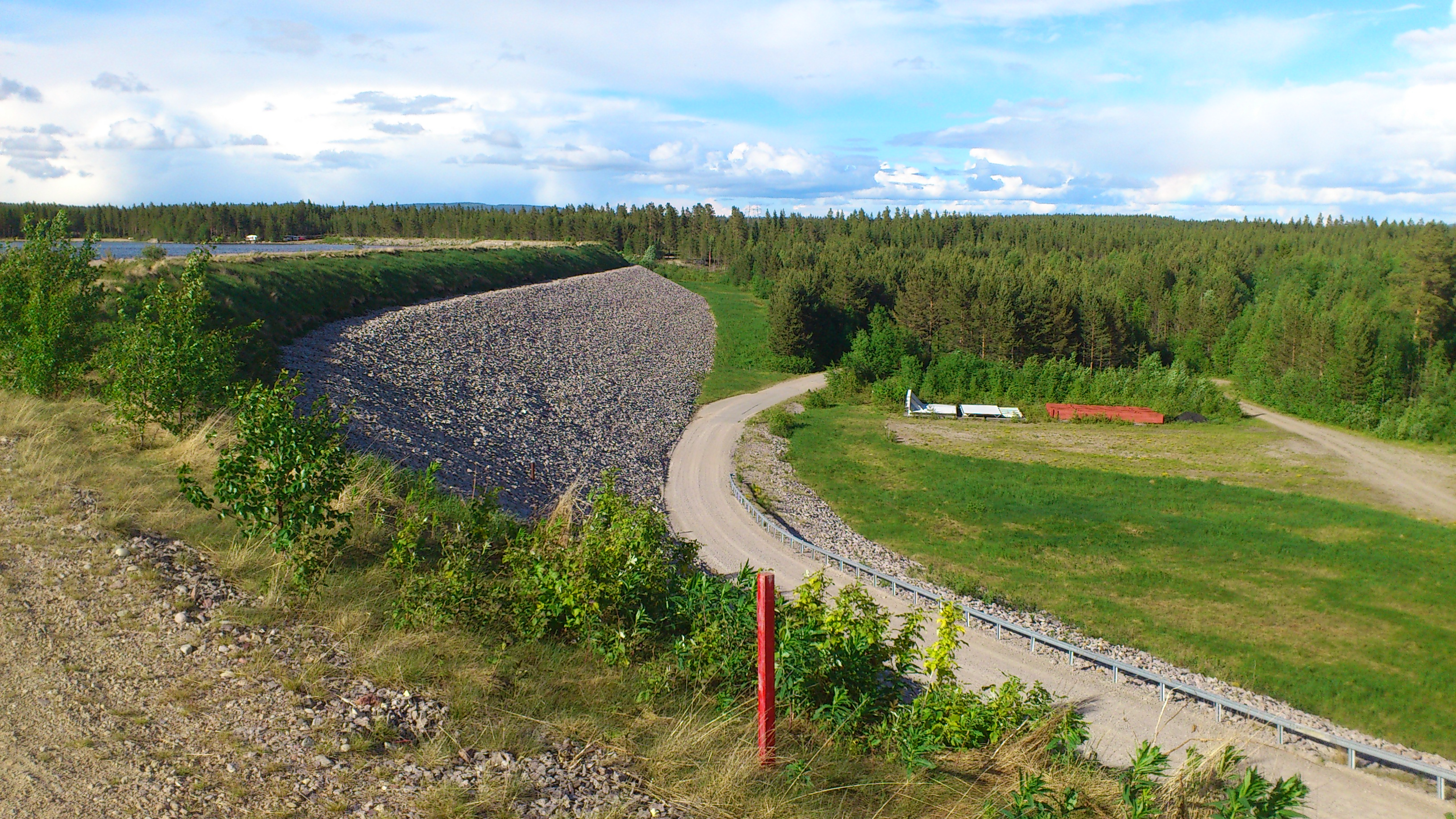
Sveg Power Plant at Svegssjön

== Hydroelectric power plants ==
Sveg Power Plant (Svegs kraftverk) is a hydroelectric power plant that began to be built in 1972. The work was greatly accelerated as the energy crisis increased the need for Swedish energy production. The power plant was commissioned in 1975. The power plant is located at the 18 meter high dam next to Lake Svegssjön, a water reservoir that was created when the Ljusnan, Veman and Härjån rivers were dammed up in 1975.

There are two power plant facilities directly adjacent to the lake. Svegs kraftverk is the larger of the facilities, and the dam itself, is located near Sveg. The smaller power plant located at Kvarnforsen just south of Herrö was built in 1966 and is owned by Härjeåns Kraft AB.

== Sveg Church ==
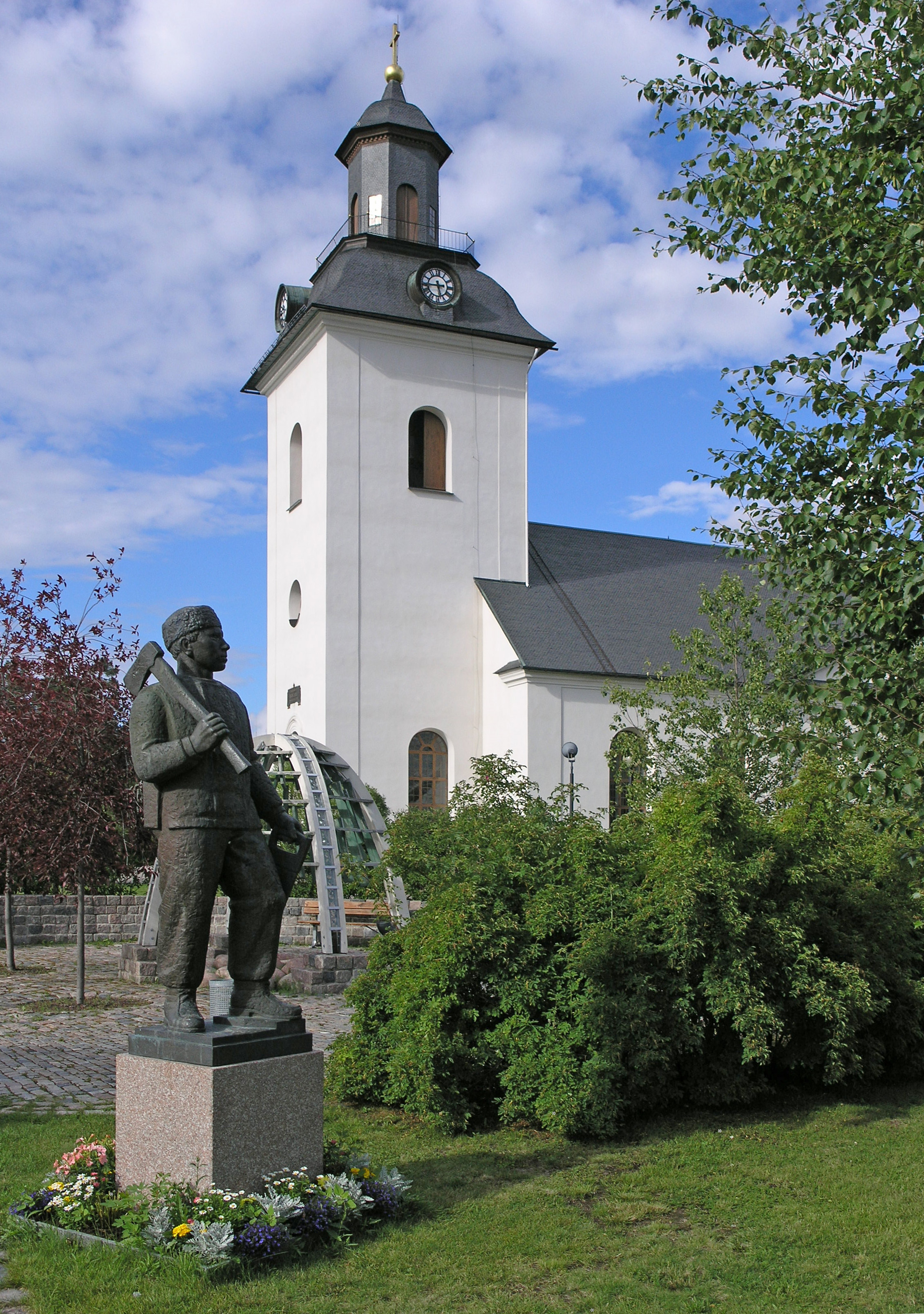
Sveg Church

Sveg Church (Svegs kyrka) is located in central Sveg. The church is of stone with towers and narrower sacristy. It was built in 1845–47. The present church is believed to have been preceded by at least three prior church buildings, the first of which was probably built in the late 1000s. Construction was under the direction of Jacob Norin (1795–1864) from Norrala in Hälsingland. The church includes an altar from 1623 and a pulpit from 1649. The church bell was cast at Stockholm in 1683.

== Climate ==
Sveg has a relatively mild subarctic climate. It has certain continental features, being prone to heat and cold extremes with an all-time record of 36 °C (97 °F) and a cold extreme of −43 °C (−45 °F), although the latter was set in the 19th century. A more recent reading was −42.6 °C (−44.7 °F) in January 1987 during a chilling cold wave that struck Northern Europe. In spite of it being in the middle of the Scandinavian landmass on such a high latitude and a bit elevated, the winters are somewhat milder than expected, due to the mild North Atlantic air that often raises temperatures. Summer days are often warm, many times averaging around 20 °C (68 °F), but nights are regularly cool, and frost can be recorded even in the midst of summer. In terms of Scandinavian climate, Sveg is an anomaly in that December is at least as cold as February, both averaging similar means.

Climate data for Sveg 2002–2020; extremes since 1901
| Month | Jan | Feb | Mar | Apr | May | Jun | Jul | Aug | Sep | Oct | Nov | Dec | Year |
|---|---|---|---|---|---|---|---|---|---|---|---|---|---|
| Record high °C (°F) | 10.0 (50.0) | 10.0 (50.0) | 16.0 (60.8) | 22.5 (72.5) | 28.0 (82.4) | 35.0 (95.0) | 36.0 (96.8) | 33.0 (91.4) | 27.4 (81.3) | 21.9 (71.4) | 13.7 (56.7) | 9.9 (49.8) | 36.0 (96.8) |
| Mean maximum °C (°F) | 4.4 (39.9) | 4.9 (40.8) | 9.5 (49.1) | 16.6 (61.9) | 23.5 (74.3) | 26.5 (79.7) | 27.5 (81.5) | 25.7 (78.3) | 20.5 (68.9) | 13.5 (56.3) | 8.2 (46.8) | 5.1 (41.2) | 29.0 (84.2) |
| Mean daily maximum °C (°F) | −3.7 (25.3) | −2.2 (28.0) | 2.2 (36.0) | 8.4 (47.1) | 14.1 (57.4) | 18.6 (65.5) | 21.0 (69.8) | 19.1 (66.4) | 13.8 (56.8) | 6.3 (43.3) | 0.9 (33.6) | −2.2 (28.0) | 8.0 (46.4) |
| Daily mean °C (°F) | −7.8 (18.0) | −6.2 (20.8) | −2.7 (27.1) | 2.9 (37.2) | 8.2 (46.8) | 12.6 (54.7) | 15.1 (59.2) | 13.4 (56.1) | 9.1 (48.4) | 2.8 (37.0) | −2.4 (27.7) | −6.2 (20.8) | 3.2 (37.8) |
| Mean daily minimum °C (°F) | −11.8 (10.8) | −10.2 (13.6) | −7.6 (18.3) | −2.6 (27.3) | 2.2 (36.0) | 6.6 (43.9) | 9.2 (48.6) | 7.7 (45.9) | 4.4 (39.9) | −0.8 (30.6) | −5.6 (21.9) | −10.2 (13.6) | −1.6 (29.2) |
| Mean minimum °C (°F) | −26.6 (−15.9) | −26.1 (−15.0) | −21.9 (−7.4) | −10.5 (13.1) | −5.3 (22.5) | −0.8 (30.6) | 1.8 (35.2) | 0.1 (32.2) | −2.8 (27.0) | −10.3 (13.5) | −17.0 (1.4) | −23.7 (−10.7) | −30.3 (−22.5) |
| Record low °C (°F) | −42.6 (−44.7) | −39.8 (−39.6) | −38.0 (−36.4) | −27.0 (−16.6) | −12.5 (9.5) | −8.0 (17.6) | −3.0 (26.6) | −5.7 (21.7) | −10.5 (13.1) | −25.9 (−14.6) | −33.0 (−27.4) | −41.0 (−41.8) | −42.6 (−44.7) |
| Average precipitation mm (inches) | 31.7 (1.25) | 23.4 (0.92) | 21.0 (0.83) | 22.5 (0.89) | 49.0 (1.93) | 70.6 (2.78) | 84.1 (3.31) | 88.6 (3.49) | 48.0 (1.89) | 45.6 (1.80) | 35.1 (1.38) | 32.7 (1.29) | 552.3 (21.76) |
Source 1: SMHI Open Data
Source 2: SMHI climate data 2002–2020

== Literature ==
Swedish author Henning Mankell (1948–2015) was brought up in Sveg, where his father was a district judge. Sveg is the setting for his crime novel Danslärarens återkomst (2000) which was translated by Laurie Thompson (1938–2015) into English as The Return of the Dancing Master.

== See also ==
- Svegs IK
- Knatten
- Sveg Airport
