= Sonfjället National Park =

National park in Sweden

- Sonfjällets nationalpark
- IUCN category II (national park)
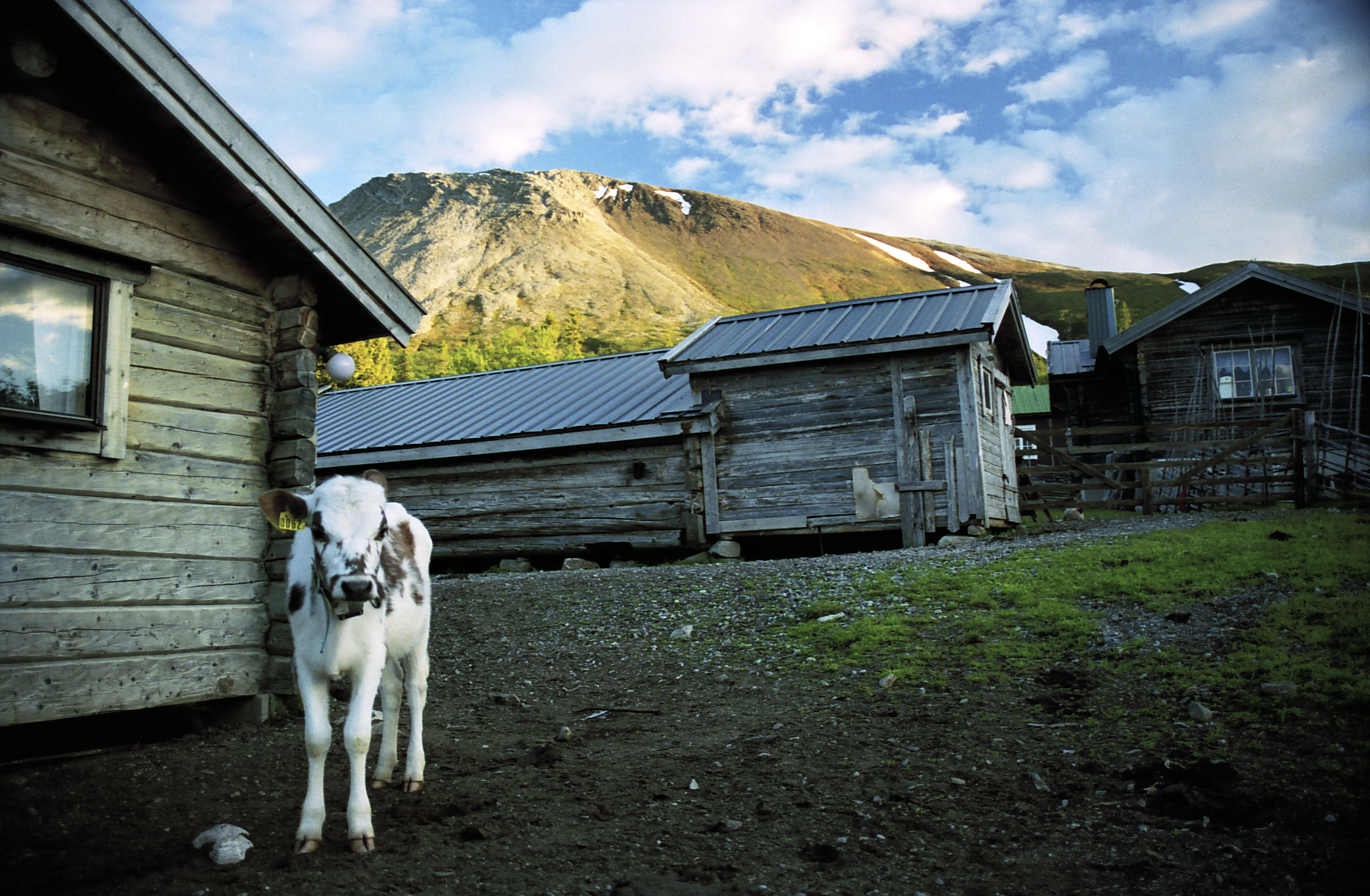
- Nyvallens fäbodvall (seter) in the national park
- Interactive map of Sonfjället National Park
- Location: Jämtland County, Sweden
- Coordinates: 62°17′N 13°32′E
- Area: 103 km^{2} (40 sq mi)
- Established: 1909, extended 1989
- Governing body: Naturvårdsverket

National parks of Sweden (clickable map)

Sonfjället, also spelled Sånfjället (Swedish pronunciation: [ˈsôːnˌfjɛlːɛt]; local dialect: Sôna), is a national park situated in Härjedalen, in central Sweden. It was established in 1909, making it one of Europe's oldest national parks. Following a land extension in 1989, it now covers 103 km^{2} (40 sq mi).

The mountainous area is filled with large boulders, intersected by streaming lakes. Trailing around the mountain area is also a widespread forest area.

The park is noted for the animals living in it: a resident bear tribe, and a large elk tribe. Other animals are also common, including wolves and lynx.

== Etymology ==
The national park is named after the mountain Sonfjället which reaches 1,278 m (4,193 ft) above sea level. The exact meaning of the word son in this context is not known. It may be related to the Old West Norse word sunna, meaning Sun, and Sonfjället would thus literally mean "the sun fell". This theory has however been disputed and claimed to be inconsistent with the local pronunciation.

From 1919 to 2010, the name was officially spelled as Sånfjället, which the governing body thought better represented the pronunciation; however, in June 2010, the official spelling was reverted to Sonfjället.

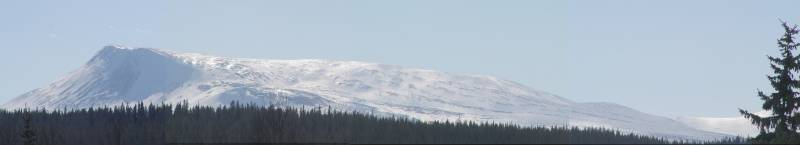
Sonfjället
