= Vemdalen =

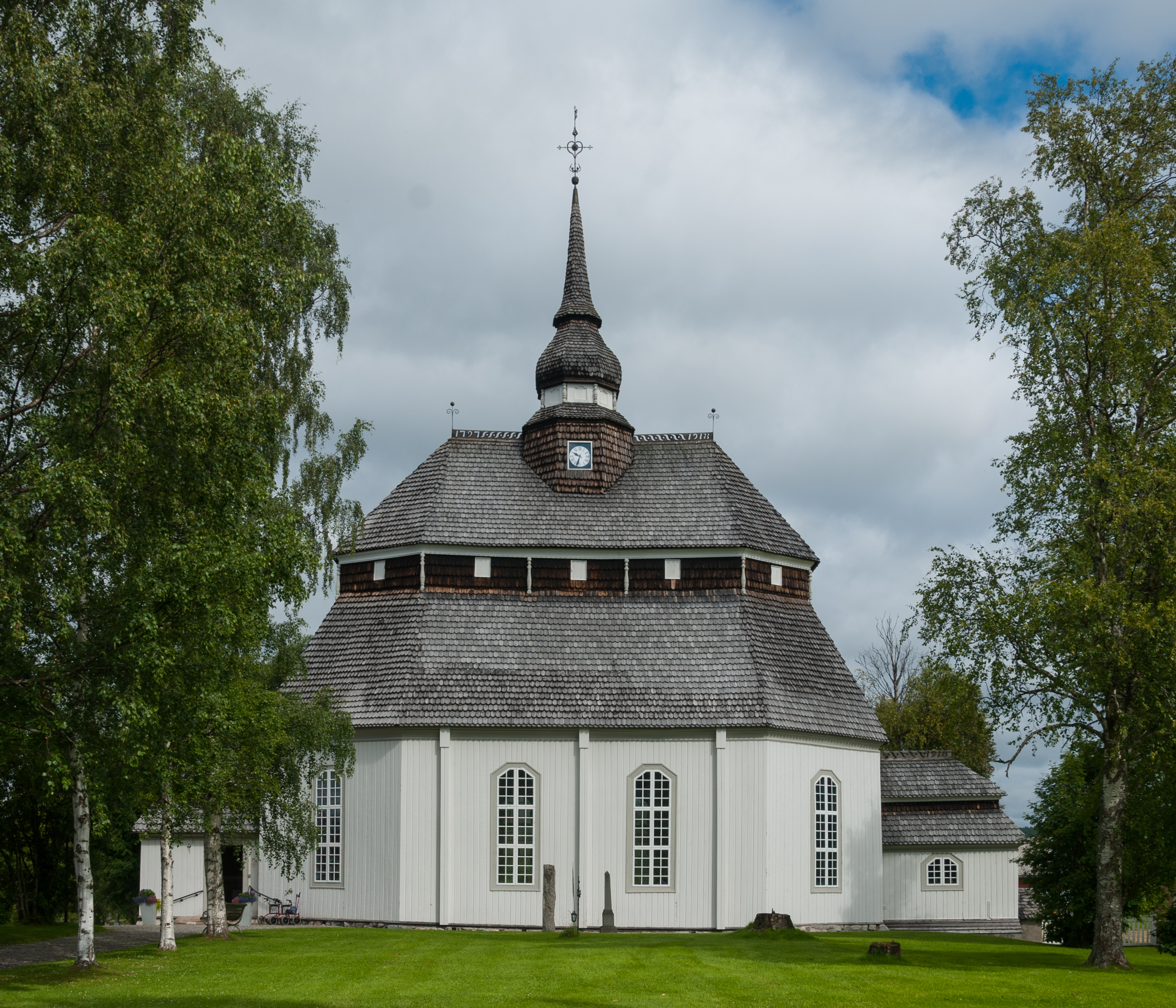
- Vemdalen Church in August 2012

- Location within Jämtland Location within Sweden
- Coordinates: 62°27′N 13°52′E
- Country: Sweden
- Province: Härjedalen
- County: Jämtland County
- Municipality: Härjedalen Municipality

Area
  - Total: 3.19 km^{2} (1.23 sq mi)

Population (31 December 2010)
  - Total: 542
  - Density: 170/km^{2} (440/sq mi)
- Time zone: UTC+1 (CET)
  - Summer (DST): UTC+2 (CEST)

Vemdalen (Swedish pronunciation: [ˈvɛ̂mːˌdɑːlɛn]) is a village situated in Härjedalen Municipality, Jämtland County, Sweden with 542 inhabitants in 2010.

Vemdalen has been developed as a skiing center. There are three popular ski resorts close to the Vemdalen; Vemdalsskalet, Klövsjö/Storhogna and Björnrike.

Vemdalen Church (Vemdalens kyrka) was erected in 1624 and moved to its present site in 1763. The church building was constructed of wood and covered with wood shingles. A free standing bell tower was erected in 1755. The foundation consists of natural stone. The church has an octagonal floor plan. The church pulpit is carved by Jöns Ljungberg (1736-1818). The altarpiece was carved by Jonas Granberg (1696-1776) between 1770 and 1773. The church belongs to the parish of Hedebygden in the Diocese of Härnösand.
