= Svegs IK =

Swedish football club

- Full name: Svegs Idrottsklubb
- Founded: 1906
- Ground: Svegs IP; Sveg; Sweden
- Chairman: Roland Tullnérs
- League: Division 4 Jämtland/Härjedalen
Home colours	Away colours

Svegs IK is a Swedish sports club located in Sveg.

== Background ==
Svegs IK currently plays football in Division 4 Jämtland/Härjedalen which is the sixth tier of Swedish football. They play their home matches at the Svegs IP in Sveg.

The club is affiliated to Jämtland-Härjedalens Fotbollförbund.

The club is also active in bandy, ice hockey and skiing.

== Season to season ==
In their most successful period Svegs IK competed in the following divisions:

Season	Level	Division	Section	Position	Movements
1965	Tier 4	Division 4	Härjedalen/Medelpad	5th	
1966	Tier 4	Division 4	Härjedalen/Medelpad	7th	
1967	Tier 4	Division 4	Härjedalen/Medelpad	8th	
1968	Tier 4	Division 4	Härjedalen/Medelpad	6th	
1969	Tier 4	Division 4	Medelpad-Härjedalen	9th	Relegated

In recent seasons Svegs IK have competed in the following divisions:

Season	Level	Division	Section	Position	Movements
1999	Tier 6	Division 5	Jämtland/Härjedalen	8th	
2000	Tier 6	Division 5	Jämtland/Härjedalen Södra	1st	Promoted
2001	Tier 5	Division 4	Jämtland/Härjedalen	9th	
2002	Tier 5	Division 4	Jämtland/Härjedalen	4th	
2003	Tier 5	Division 4	Jämtland/Härjedalen	6th	
2004	Tier 5	Division 4	Jämtland/Härjedalen	8th	
2005	Tier 5	Division 4	Jämtland/Härjedalen	8th	
2006*	Tier 6	Division 4	Jämtland/Härjedalen	9th	Relegated
2007	Tier 7	Division 5	Jämtland/Härjedalen Södra	5th	
2008	Tier 7	Division 5	Jämtland/Härjedalen Södra	7th	
2009	Tier 7	Division 5	Jämtland/Härjedalen	6th	
2010	Tier 7	Division 5	Jämtland/Härjedalen Södra	2nd	Promoted
2011	Tier 6	Division 4	Jämtland/Härjedalen	7th	

* League restructuring in 2006 resulted in a new division being created at Tier 3 and subsequent divisions dropping a level.
