= Härjedalen =

Historical province of Sweden

Coordinates: 62°15′N 13°57′E

- Historical province
- Flag Coat of arms

- Country: Sweden
- Land: Norrland
- Counties: Jämtland County; Dalarna County

Area
  - Total: 11,405 km^{2} (4,403 sq mi)

Population (31 December 2023)
  - Total: 9,705
  - Density: 0.8509/km^{2} (2.204/sq mi)

Ethnicity
  - Language: Swedish

Culture
  - Flower: Arctic violet
  - Animal: Bear
  - Bird: Golden eagle
  - Fish: Grayling
- Time zone: UTC+1 (CET)
  - Summer (DST): UTC+2 (CEST)

Härjedalen (Swedish: [ˈhæ̂rjɛˌdɑːlɛn]) is a historical province (landskap) in the centre of Sweden. It borders the Norwegian county of Trøndelag, as well as the provinces of Dalarna, Hälsingland, Medelpad and Jämtland. The province originally belonged to Norway, but was ceded to Sweden in the Second Treaty of Brömsebro in 1645. The province forms the bulk of Härjedalen Municipality of which the village of Sveg is the seat.

== Etymology ==
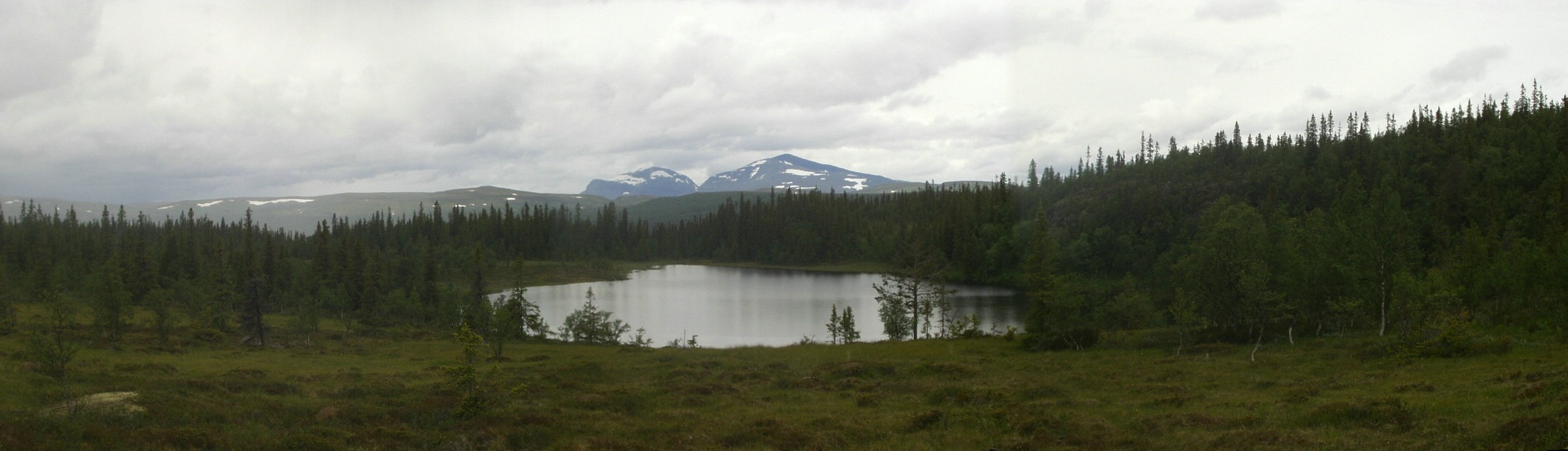
The tarn Björnskalletjärn, with Mt. Helags in the background

The name Härjedalen, from Old West Norse Herjárdalr, literally means the "Valley of the Härje river". A Latinized transliteration is Herdalia although that name is hardly encountered in English today. More prominent are derivations such as Herjedalen or Haerjedalen. The more prosaic explanation of the name is that the word her or har means only "mound of stones" and refers to stones in the river Härjån.

== History ==
Härjedalen and Jämtland were provinces of Denmark-Norway until the mid-17th century. Härjedalen came under the Norwegian king in the Middle Ages, ca. 1100. After the Treaty of Brömsebro in 1645, Härjedalen and Jämtland were ceded to Sweden. They were commonly spelled Herjedalen and Jemtland until 1660.

The first population of Härjedalen is estimated to have migrated there circa 7,000 BC. The population lived from hunting and fishing, close to the inland ice which by then had started to melt. Ruändan, in the Flatruet mountains in northwestern Härjedalen, is the location of a large site of rock paintings. The rock paintings at Ruändan consists of some twenty figures depicting people, bear, moose and reindeer. The rock paintings were first reported in 1896 and are estimated to be over 4000 years old.

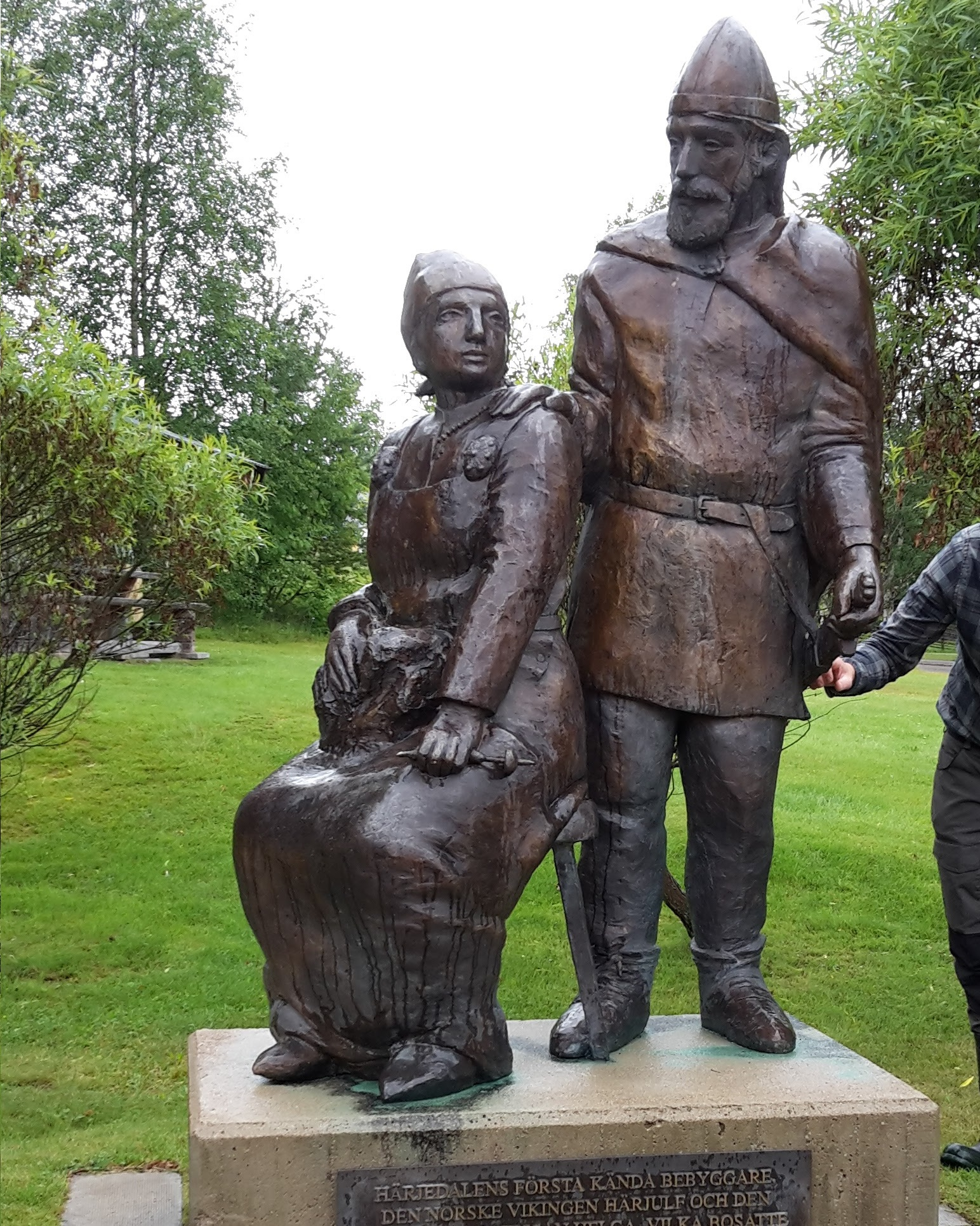
Statue of Härjulf Hornbrytare and his wife, Helga, in Lillhärdal

According to legend, Härjedalen is named after a powerful Norseman who had to flee east from the Norwegian court of King Halfdan Svarte after killing one of the king's men with a horn. Thereafter he was known as Härjulf Hornbrytare (lit. "Härjulf the Hornbreaker"). For a time he entered the service of the Svea King Anund, until he eloped with that king's sister, Helga, and together they disappeared into the remote location in the region eventually named after him. Today a statue stands dedicated to them in the village of Lillhärdal. Härjulf and Helga were the foreparents to the Icelander, Bjarni Herjólfsson, who was the first Norseman to see the "new world" when he was blown off-course whilst on a voyage to Greenland. His boat is the one Leif Erikson acquired about 15 years later for Leif's famed landing on Vinland.

Christianization of Härjedalen took place after the Battle of Stiklestad in 1030. Agriculture remained Härjedalen's largest industry for a long time, supplemented by ironmaking and trade mainly to Røros in Trøndelag. Extensive forestry also played a major role in Härjedalen resulting of industrialization which occurred in the mid-1850s. A large portion of Härjedalen residents emigrated to America, principally to Northwestern Minnesota during the late 1800s. More recently, Härjedalen has increasingly taken up the position as a tourist landscape with large mountain facilities in Funäsdalen, Vemdalen, and Lofsdalen.

== Geography ==
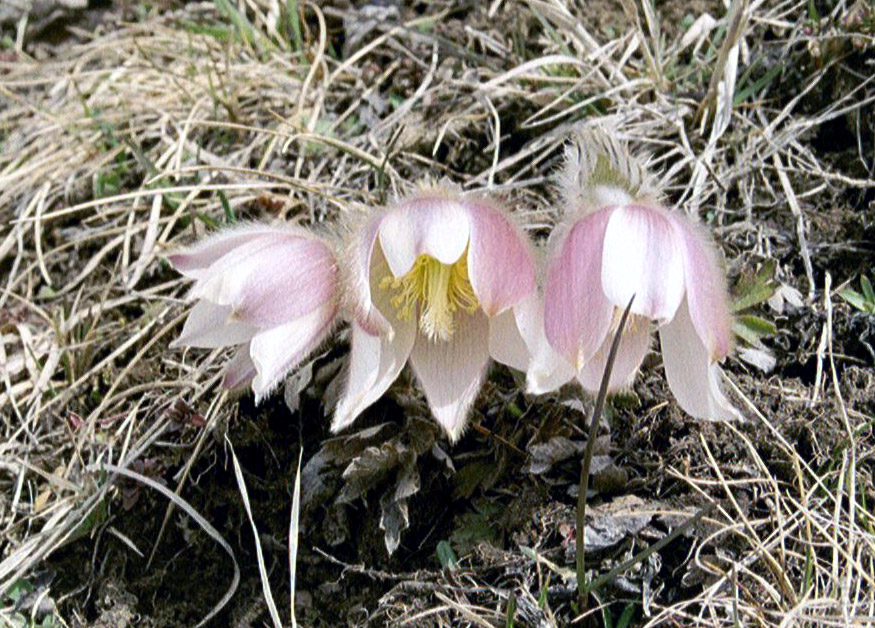
Arctic violet

Four-fifths of the province is situated above 500 metres of altitude, constituting a part of the Scandinavian mountain range. Sweden's highest village Högvålen, at 835 metres, is also within the province.

Härjedalen does not have any cities at all. The only village of even modest size is the market town Sveg, which used to be the administrative centre of the province.

The provincial flower is the Arctic violet. It is prominent on high altitudes in Europe, and is also found in the Alps.

Sånfjället National Park extends through the municipality.

== Administration ==
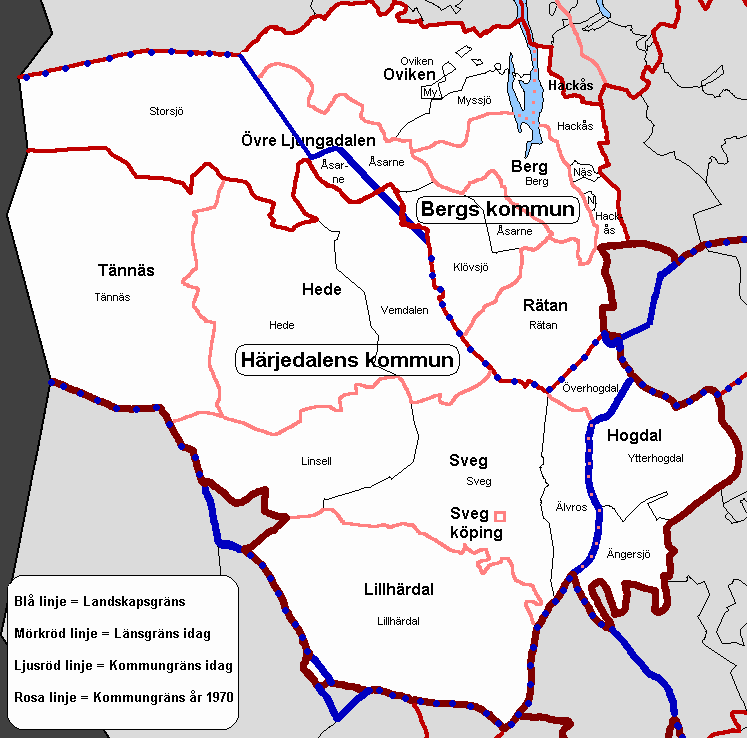
Map of Härjedalen (within the blue line)

The traditional provinces of Sweden serve no current administrative or political purposes, but are historical and cultural entities. In the case of Härjedalen there is a municipality, kommun, Härjedalen Municipality, which is located in the southern part of Jämtland County. The municipality does not exactly correspond to the province, but is larger.

=== Subdivisions ===
Härjedalen was historically divided into districts.

- Hede Court District
- Sveg Court District

== Heraldry ==
The arms is represented with a ducal coronet. Blazon: "Argent a Sledgehammer Sable with Core Gules between Tongs of the second and two Hammers adorsed in pale of the second handled Gules.". It was granted in 1660. Since 1974, Härjedalen Municipality uses the same coat of arms, but without the coronet.

== Sports ==
Football in the province is administered by Jämtland-Härjedalens Fotbollförbund.

== Other sources ==
- Bergström-Magnusson-Raihle (1991) Härjedalen - Natur och kulturhistoria (Östersund: Jämtlands läns museum) ISBN 91-7948-065-9
