= March 1982 =

Month of 1982

<<	March 1982					>>
Su	Mo	Tu	We	Th	Fr	Sa
	1	2	3	4	5	6
7	8	9	10	11	12	13
14	15	16	17	18	19	20
21	22	23	24	25	26	27
28	29	30	31

The following events occurred in March 1982:

== March 1, 1982 (Monday) ==
- The Soviet Union's Venera 3 probe landed on the surface of the planet Venus at 03:57 UTC near the Phoebe Regio and returned data for two hours and seven minutes, eventually failing under temperatures of 457 °C (855 °F). The probe returned eight photographs of the surface, the first since the original Venera lander had transmitted the first pictures on October 22, 1975.
- The U.S. Department of State added the nation of Cuba to its list of countries that "support international terrorism", as described in its annual report to Congress, but removed Iraq from the list. The other three nations listed were Syria, South Yemen and Libya.
- Iran's parliament, the Majlis, voted to allow the Islamic Republic's government to sell the historic treasures that had been collected by the deposed Shah of Iran during his reign.
- In Japan, what would become the TX Network of television stations, was created as the "Mega TON Network" when the independent TV Tokyo station began transmitting on a new affiliate 250 miles (400 km) distant, TV Osaka and had plans to add another affiliate in Nagoya, reflected in the "TON" name. The TX Network has operated since 1991 with seven stations on Japan's four main islands from Hokkaido to Fukuoka.
- The Symantec Corporation, developer of cybersecurity software, was incorporated in the U.S. by Gary Hendrix with the aid of a National Science Foundation grant. It would change its name to NortonLifeLock Inc in 2019 and to Gen Digital in 2022.
- Born:
  - Toyin Lawani, Nigerian fashion designer, entrepreneur and television pwersonality
  - Seymur Hazi, Azerbaijani journalist and politician; in Dünyamalılar, Azerbaijani SSR, Soviet Union

== March 2, 1982 (Tuesday) ==
- Engineered by the terrorist group Sendero Luminoso, a mass prison escape freed 255 inmates from incarceration in the Peruvian city of Ayacucho. In the 5-hour battle, 16 people were killed, including two prison guards.
- France's Law of Decentralization, drafted by Interior Minister Gaston Defferre, was passed into law by the Assemblée nationale, creating the administrative regions of France, a new level of subnational divisions between the départements and the national government. While the 96 metropolitan départements continue to have autonomy, they were grouped into 22 metropolitan régions française which through mergers have now become 13. The reform also gave autonomy and limited self-government to some minority-populated areas with the creation of the collectivité territoriale, including the island of Corsica. With self-government for Corsica, the French government released the remaining members of the Fronte di Liberazione Naziunale di a Corsica, including Alain Orsoni, from the Fleury-Mérogis Prison.
- South Korea's government announced a general amnesty for 2,863 prisoners, including 297 dissidents deemed as political offenders. While former opposition leader Kim Dae Jung was not released, his sentence of life imprisonment was reduced to 20 years incarceration. Observers noted that none of 419 of South Korea's known political prisoners were scheduled for release.
- U.S. Secretary of State Alexander Haig said in testimony to the House Foreign Affairs Committee that he had "overwhelming and irrefutable" evidence that a rebellion against El Salvador's right-wing military government was being directed by foreign powers. The House voted, 396 to 3, to urge U.S. President Ronald Reagan to press for unconditional discussions among El Salvador's political factions to "guarantee a safe and stable environment for free and open elections."
- Multicandidate elections were held in Algeria for all 282 seats of the People's National Assembly (the Majlis al-Sha'abi). Although all the candidates were members of Algeria's only legal political party, the Front de liberation nationale (FLN), there were 846 candidates, an average of three per seat. Of the 282 seats, 136 incumbents ran, and only 69 won re-election.
- Israeli troops began removing Jewish settlers from Ophira, an unauthorized settlement near Sharm el-Sheik on the southern tip of Egypt's Sinai Peninsula in advance of the scheduled April 25 withdrawal of Israel from the area.
- An assassination attempt was made in Belfast against Lord Lowry, the Lord Chief Justice of Northern Ireland, as two gunmen of the Irish Republican Army fired four shots at him as he arrived at Queen's University for a luncheon. While Lowry was not struck by a bullet, a stray round struck a Queens professor, Robert Parks, in the left buttock.
- The film Diner, directed by Barry Levinson, had its world premiere at the Senator Theater in Levinson's hometown of Baltimore before going into release throughout the United States on March 5.
- TriStar Pictures was founded a joint filmmaking venture by three companies (Columbia Pictures, CBS and HBO) as "Nova Pictures", although the name would be changed a year later to avoid confusion with the PBS television series Nova.
- Born: Anup Bhandari, Indian composer and Kannada language film director known for directing the popular 2015 mystery film RangiTaranga; in Puttur, Karnataka
- Died:
  - Philip K. Dick, 53, American science fiction writer known for The Man in the High Castle (1962) and Do Androids Dream of Electric Sheep? (1968), died from complications of a stroke.
  - Haunani Kahalewai (born Myrna Kahaunaniomaunakeakauiokalewa Kahalewai), 53, Hawaiian American singer, died from a heart attack.

== March 3, 1982 (Wednesday) ==
- An attempt by Ange-Félix Patassé was made to overthrow the government of the Central African Republic and its president, General André Kolingba]. Patassé, leader of the outlawed Movement for the Liberation of the Central African People (MLBC), was able to seize control of a radio station in the capital, Bangui with the aid of about 100 rebel troops led by General François Bozizé, and Bozize announced Kolingba's overthrow. However, the MLBC was unable to persuade other military officers to join. After four days, the coup collapsed and Patasse and Bozise were given sanctuary in the French Embassy, and then left the country.
- Chavviram Singh Yadav, one of India's most notorious bandit leaders in the Chambal Valley, was killed in a 90-minute gunbattle in the city of Etah in Uttar Pradesh state police, along with 12 of his followers. In addition to terrorizing state residents with his random attacks, Chavviram also committed murders in Madhya Pradesh and Rajasthan. His body and those of his henchmen were then displayed on posts at the town of Aliganj. The Indian press reported his death on March 5.
- One of Germany's strangest hoaxes, the mystery of "Chopper, was solved in the town of Neutraubling in West Germany by local police. Since 1981, "Chopper" had been haunting the office of dentist Kurt Backseitz, starting with phone calls and, after phone lines were replaced, speaking from sinks, toilets and unplugged electric sockets in the wall. Detectives noticed that the 16-year-old dental assistant, identified only as "Claudia", always turned her back when Chopper's words were heard, and caught her reflection in a mirror. Dr. Backseitz, his wife and Claudia were all brought to the Neutraubling police station and admitted that they had plotted the deception. In all, the police and the phone company had spent 60,000 deutschmarks (DM) (about $26,000 USD) in trying to locate the source of Chopper's voice. Dr. and Mrs. Backseitz were fined DM 35,000 ($15,000) for restitution of the costs expended, and Claudia fined DM 1500.
- Reino Aventura opened in the Mexico City suburb of Tlalpan as the largest amusement park in Latin America. In 1999 it would be purchased and remodeled, and reopened in 2000 as Six Flags Mexico.
- The Israeli settlement of Hatzer Adar, established in Egypt's Sinai Peninsula in December as one of the last attempts at Jewish settlement on the land before it was to be turned over to Egyptian control by the Camp David Accords, was forcibly dismantled and its 50 settlers were removed by the Israeli Defense Forces (IDF). Other settlements in the Yamit Region (Yamit, Atzmona, Nativ Haasara, Sadot, Dekla, Pri-El, Pri Gan, Telmei Yosef, Ugda, Nir Avraham, Neot Sinai, Harovit, Sufa, Avshalom and Holi) had already been closed and its settlers evacuated in advance of the April 15 date for the first withdrawal of the IDF.
- Born: Jessica Biel, American actress, producer and singer in film and television; in Ely, Minnesota
- Died:
  - Firaq Gorakhpuri (pen name for Raghupati Sahay, 85, Indian Urdu language poet and commentator
  - Mian Ehsan-ul-Haq, 66, Indian-born Pakistani film producer known for the 1957 hit film Waada
  - Muhammad al-Mahdi al-Majdhub, 62, Sudanese Arabic poet
  - Keshto Mukherjee, 56, Indian character actor and comedian known for his portrayal of drunkards in Hindi language films (despite being a lifelong teetotaler) was killed in an accident in Bombay.
  - Sekine Evren, 59, Turkish activist and wife President Kenan Evren as First Lady of Turkey, died from complications of a 1980 stroke.

== March 4, 1982 (Thursday) ==
- Bertha Wilson became the first woman to be appointed to the Supreme Court of Canada.
- Mario Andretti ceased any further appeals in his attempt to be declared the winner of the 1981 Indianapolis 500. In the race on May 24, 1981, Bobby Unser crossed the finish line first, but was then disqualified and second place finisher Andretti was declared the winner. Unser appealed to the United States Auto Club panel, which restored the win to him on October 8, 1981. Andretti had then appealed but continued to be denied, and abandoned the effort, with Unser winning the race after more than nine months.
- Born:
  - Landon Donovan, American footballer (soccer player) with 157 caps for the U.S. national team from 2000 to 2014; in Ontario, California
  - K. Michelle (stage name for Kimberly Michelle Pate), American R & B singer, songwriter and TV personality, known for her 2013 album Rebellious Soul and the 2022 hit song "Scooch"; in Memphis, Tennessee
- Died: Bill DeWitt, 79, American major league baseball team owner and general manager who owned the St. Louis Browns (1948 to 1951) and the Cincinnati Reds (1962 to 1966)

== March 5, 1982 (Friday) ==
- Zhao Cangbi, the Minister of Public Security for the People's Republic of China, announced a plan to release of 4,327 former Republic of China government officials who had been imprisoned for more than 30 years since the defeat of Chiang Kai-shek by the Chinese Communist Army in 1949. Zhao told the National People's Congress that the government would pay the expenses for transport for those who wanted to move to Taiwan, and that those who chose to stay and who were still able to work would be given jobs. A bulletin from the government's Xinhua News Agency quoted Zhao as saying "These former Kuomintang personnel in custody have repented and by and large have turned over a new leaf after a long period of education and reform.
- Venera 14, the second of two Soviet space probes, landed on Venus at 0604 UTC, and sent data for about one hour. As with Venera 13, the probe returned data to other Soviet spaceships flying by the planet, which then relayed images back to Earth. Venera 14 landed about 590 miles (950 km) southwest of Venera 13, which had also touched down at the Phoebe Regio section of Venus.

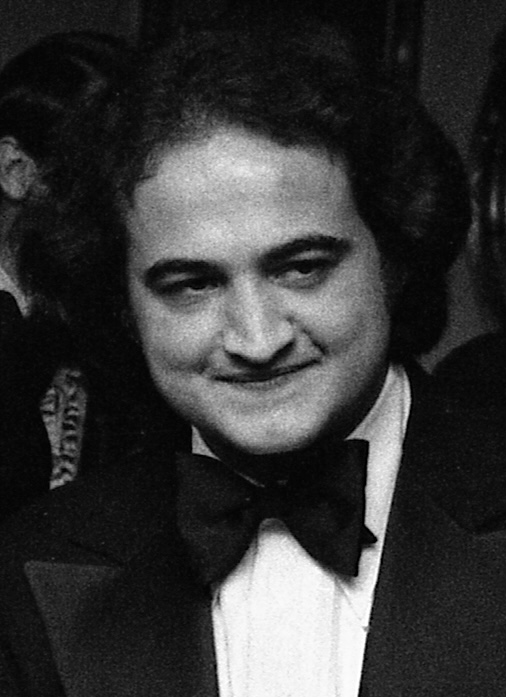
Belushi in 1979

- Died: John Belushi, American comedian, actor and musician, died after multiple injections of speedball, a combination of cocaine and heroin while he was staying at a bungalow at the Chateau Marmont celebrity resort in Hollywood, California. A female friend, Cathy Smith, would later be convicted in 1986 of involuntary manslaughter.

== March 6, 1982 (Saturday) ==
- Five Egyptian Moslem fundamentalists were sentenced to death for their role in the October 6 assassination of Egypt's President Anwar Sadat, with four having been the soldiers who had opened fire on Sadat while he was reviewing a military parade (including their leader, Lt. Khaled Ahmed el-Istambouly) and the fifth having been an associate who had provided the ammunition. Another 17 defendants were convicted as accessories and given terms ranging from one year up to life in prison.
- In the National Basketball Association (NBA), the San Antonio Spurs defeated the Milwaukee Bucks, 171 to 166 in triple overtime to set a new record for most points by both teams (337) in a game. The record would be broken less than two years later on December 13, 1983, with the Detroit Pistons' 186 to 184 win over the Denver Nuggets.
- During a soccer football match in Brazil between Operário-MS and CR Vasco da Gama at Campo Grande in the Mato Grosso do Sul state, thousands of spectators saw a UFO as a "cigar-shaped object" with lights at each end flew overhead. The incident inspired one of the witnesses, chemistry teacher A. J. Gevaerd, to make a career of investigating and lecturing about unidentified flying objects worldwide.
- Died: Ayn Rand, 72, American philosopher, novelist and non-fiction writer known for The Fountainhead (1943) and for Capitalism: The Unknown Ideal (1966), and for editing The Objectivist.

== March 7, 1982 (Sunday) ==
- Presidential and congressional elections took place in Guatemala. Picked as a successor by incumbent president Fernando Romeo Lucas García, General Angel Anibal Guevara, received a plurality (almost 39%) of the vote, with former vice president Mario Sandoval Alarcón (28%) and future president Alejandro Maldonado Aguirre (23%) finishing second and third, and Anibal's Popular Democratic Front, an alliance of three parties, won 33 of the 66 seats in the Guatemalan Congress. The Guatemalan government was overthrown 16 days later and the election results nullified by dissatisfied army officers.
- Died:
  - Viscount Blakenham (John Hare), 71, British politician who was chairman of the Conservative Party from 1963 to 1965, Secretary of State for War (1956 to 1958), Agricultural Minister (1958-1960) and Minister of Labour (1960 to 1963)
  - Ida Barney, 95, American astronomer known for having calculated and recorded the astrometric measurements for position, apparent magnitude and proper motion for almost 150,000 stars over a 23 year period.
  - Charles A. Finn, 104, the oldest ordained priest in the United States, serving from 1903 to 1977
  - Otto von Bolschwing, 72, German-born intelligence agent for the American CIA, and a U.S. citizen from 1959 until 1981, when he was forced to surrender his citizenship for failing to disclose his complicity in Nazi German war crimes, died in a nursing home in Carmichael, California, before he could be deported.
  - Charles Mills, 68, American classical music composer

== March 8, 1982 (Monday) ==
- The People's Republic of China approved a reorganization plan to reduce the number of ministries from 12 to six, to reduce the number of Vice-Premiers from 13 to 2, and to consolidate 98 state council organizations to 52, with a forecast to fire more than one-third of the 49,000 ministerial staff members to only 32,000.
- The British House of Commons voted, 177 to 13, to approve the patriation bill allowing Canada to create its own constitution. Fewer than one-third of the 635 members of Commons turned out to vote. The House of Lords followed suit on March 25, and the bill was sent to Queen Elizabeth II for royal assent, which came on March 29.
- The experimental light monoplane Free Enterprise, built by Gene Sheehan and Tom Jewett designed to make the first flight around the world without refueling, made its first public test flight, with announced plans to attempt the circumnavigation flight in the autumn. However, Jewett would be killed, and the Free Enterprise destroyed, in a test flight on July 2, 1982.
- In Viña del Mar in Chile, two recently-fired members of the Carabineros police force, Jorge José Sagredo Pizarro and Carlos Alberto Topp Collins, were apprehended. They were charged with having killed 10 people over a 15-month period, and having raped four other women who survived. Nicknamed the "Viña del Mar psychopaths" (Psicópatas de Viña del Mar), Sagredo and Topp would be executed by firing squad on January 29, 1985.

== March 9, 1982 (Tuesday) ==
- Charles Haughey was elected as the new Taoiseach, the prime minister of Ireland, by the Dail, by a vote of 86 to 79 over his opponent, incumbent Taoiseach Garret FitzGerald.
- The U.S. Department of Defense released aerial reconnaissance photographs which it said proved that the leftist Republic of Nicaragua was attempting to build, with help from the Soviet Union and Cuba, the largest military force in Central America.
- In advance of the creation of the self-governing Valencian Community, the region's legislature voted down a proposal to adopt "the Kingdom of Valencia" as the region's name, with 151 for but 161 against. The Kingdom of Valencia had existed as an independent nation from 1238 to 1707.
- Born: Emi Yamamoto, Japanese footballer with 22 caps for the Japan women's national team; in Miura, Kanagawa Prefecture
- Died: Zvi Yehuda Kook, 90, Russian-born Israeli rabbi and Zionist who served as the first chief rabbi for the Ashkenazi Jews in Mandatory Palestine and in Israel.

== March 10, 1982 (Wednesday) ==
- The day of the "Jupiter Effect" arrived as all nine of the Solar System's planets were on the same side of the Sun, within a 95 degree arc. The eventual syzygy of the planets had been predicted decades earlier, but the event had been the basis for a bestselling book in 1974, The Jupiter Effect, by John Gribbin and Stephen Plagemann. The two wrote that the combined gravitational pull of Jupiter, Saturn, Uranus, Neptune, Mars, Venus, Mercury and Pluto would likely wreak havoc on Earth, although the predictions were dismissed by most astronomers and astrophysicists, and no unusual events occurred on the day of the syzygy.
- Euro TV was launched in Italy by Gianni Ferrauto and Calisto Tanzi, with syndicated programming to 18 stations that broadcast identical programs for six hours nationwide each day, with the remainder left to the affiliates' individual choices. The network would last for five years, until being superseded on September 5, 1987, by the Odeon 24 network.
- The United States placed an embargo on Libyan petroleum imports, citing Libya's involvement of state-sponsored terrorism.
- The Washington Post published an investigative report that asserted that President Reagan had authorized the creation of a CIA-trained paramilitary force of 500 people from other Latin American nations to lead commando raids inside Nicaragua to overthrow the Sandinista government.The State Department confirmed the next day that it had secretly provided $10.4 million in financial support to "non-Marxist democratic forces" and that it was prepared to provide $7.4 million more.
- Died: Tadj ol-Molouk, 85, mother of the late Shah of Iran Mohammad Reza Pahlavi and former Queen consort of Iran from 1925 to 1941 as wife of Reza Shah, died in exile in Mexico at the Pahlavi family residence in Acapulco.

== March 11, 1982 (Thursday) ==
- U.S. Senator Harrison A. Williams Jr. of New Jersey resigned as the Senate was preparing to vote on a resolution to expel him from office following his 1981 conviction for bribery and conspiracy in the FBI's Abscam operation.
- The crash of Widerøe Flight 933 in Norway, north of the Arctic Circle, killed all 15 people on board. The twin-engine turboprop Twin Otter airliner took off from Berlevåg on the third leg of a multi-stop flight from Høybuktmoen to Valan but fell into the Barents Sea four minutes later. The submerged airplane was found two days later, with 14 of the 15 bodies recovered.
- An attempt to overthrow the government of Suriname by army officers Surendre Rambocus, Wilfred Hawker, and Jiwansingh Sheombar failed after the coup leaders had taken control of the Memre Boekoe barracks in Paramaribo. One of the co-conspirators defected and betrayed the others before they could carry out there plan to seize Fort Zeelandia, where Suriname's dictator, Lt. Col. Dési Bouterse maintained his headquarters.
- Born: Talal Selhami, French-born Moroccan film director known for the horror film Achoura; in Neuilly-sur-Seine, Hauts-de-Seine département

== March 12, 1982 (Friday) ==
- At a press conference and briefing at the U.S. Department of State, Orlando Jose Tardencillas was introduced as proof that Marxist nations were attempting to gain control of Central America. Tardencillas, a 19-year-old Nicaraguan rebel, had been captured in El Salvador and confessed to being trained along with other Nicaraguans in Cuba and Ethiopia. When the news conference began, however, Tardencillas recanted his confession, denied that he had been trained abroad, and told reporters that he had "obviously been presented for purposes of propaganda.
- The village of Valle de Paz ("Valley of Peace") was founded in Belize in Central America as a refugee community for immigrants fleeing from the Salvadoran Civil War.
- The U.S. Department of Labor announced the first decrease in the consumer price index since February 1976, after six years of constant inflation.
- The 1.2 miles (1.9 km) long Aberdeen Tunnel opened in Hong Kong between Wong Chuk Hang and Happy Valley.
- The highest-grossing Bengali language film of the year in India, the action comedy Shathe Shathyang, directed by Dinen Gupta and starring Ranjit Mallick and Mahua Roy Choudhury, was released.
- The U.S. film Missing, directed by Costa-Gavras, starring Jack Lemmon and Sissy Spacek, and adapted from a book about the 1973 arrest and execution of American journalist Thomas Hauser in Chile, was released nationwide in the United States.
- Died: Dave "Fat Man" Williams, 61, American jazz and rhythm and blues bandleader known for the brass standard "I Ate Up the Apple Tree".

== March 13, 1982 (Saturday) ==
- A group of 45 soldiers from South Africa's 32 Battalion special forces unit, composed largely of black soldiers who had formerly served in Portugal's colonial troops before Angolan independence, crossed into Angola and killed 201 guerrillas with the South West African People's Organization (SWAPO). The Battalion lost three of its own soldiers.
- A 12-member patrol of the Army of Guatemala entered the community of Rio Negro in the Baja Verapaz province and made a house to house search of the village in search of anti-government guerrillas, then raped the women and pillaged homes and businesses. Afterwards, the patrol executed 107 children and 70 women, whose bodies would be found in 1994.
- Italy's Prime Minister Giovanni Spadolini won a vote of confidence in the Italian parliament, whose members voted their approval of his government, 352 to 237.
- Liverpool defeated Tottenham Hotspur, 3 to 1 after extra time, to win England's Football League Cup in front of a crowd of 100,000 fans at Wembley Stadium in London. Liverpool would win the First Division during the 1981-82 season, with a record of 26 wins and 9 draws (26-9-7), and Tottenham was fourth (20-11-11).
- William Shatner's successful TV series, T. J. Hooker (which would run for 91 episodes, , 12 more than Star Trek) premiered on the ABC television network in the U.S., and would continue until May 4, 1985.
- Born:
  - Nimrat Kaur, Indian film actress in Bollywood and Hollywood productions, known for The Lunchbox (2013) and Airlift (2016); in Pilani, Rajasthan state
  - Julie Chu, American and Canadian women's ice hockey player in the Canadian Women's Hockey League (CWHL); in Fairfield, Connecticut
- Died: Wilfred Hawker, 26, Surinamese Army sergeant-major, was executed by firing squad at Paramaribo after having participated led in a failed coup d'etat. The execution was videotaped and then broadcast on Surinamese television. Hawker had escaped from prison three days earlier after being freed in another coup attempt, but wounded and then re-arrested while in the hospital.

== March 14, 1982 (Sunday) ==
- Voting for both houses of the Congreso de la Republica of Colombia was held. The Partido Liberal won 104 of the 199 seats in the Cámara de Representantes and 55 of the 114 seats in the Senado.
- Nine teenagers were killed and one critically injured after their van, with 10 people aboard, was struck by a Long Island Rail Road train in Mineola, New York. The 19-year-old van driver drove around the lowered gates of a railroad crossing and then got stuck on the track. The victims ranged in age from 17 to 19 years old.
- In Morocco, one of the 24 nations in the upcoming World Cup, the soccer football team Raja Casablanca won the Moroccan Throne Cup, defeating Renaissance de Kénitra, 1 to 0, for the national tournament championship.

== March 15, 1982 (Monday) ==
- Nicaragua's leader, Daniel Ortega Saavedra declared a state of siege and suspended all constitutional rights for 30 days.
- Film actress Theresa Saldana, who had appeared in Raging Bulland co-starred in Defiance, both in 1980, was stabbed 10 times outside her home in West Hollywood, California by a stalker. After a bystander intervened to stop the attack, Saldana survived and would co-found the organization Victim for Victims, and go on to a successful TV career as co-star of The Commish on ABC from 1991 to 1996.
- The made for TV film Eunice, based on a recurring sketch from The Carol Burnett Show, was broadcast on CBS and featured Burnett and her co-stars, Harvey Korman, Vicki Lawrence, Ken Berry and Betty White. Although Lawrence's character, Thelma Harper, died at the end of the show, Lawrence would reprise the role as star of the popular situation comedy Mama's Family on NBC later in the year and then in syndication.
- Born: César Canchila, Colombian professional boxer who held the World Boxing Association light flyweight title in 2008 and 2009; in Cereté, Departamento de Córdoba
- Died:
  - Baal Oemrawsingh, 41, former Surinamese biochemistry professor and activist accused of plotting the unsuccessful March 10 coup attempt against Desi Bouterse, died in prison after having been arrested four days earlier. A government report said that he had committed suicide while awaiting trial.
  - Vladimir Smeral, 78, Czech stage and film actor known for Všichni proti všem (All Against All) (1977) and Witchhammer (1970)

== March 16, 1982 (Tuesday) ==
- Claus von Bulow was found guilty on two counts of attempted murder of his wife, Sunny von Bulow, by a jury in Newport, Rhode Island.
- Soviet head of state and party leader Leonid Brezhnev announced that the Soviet Union was halting further deployment of SS-20 nuclear missiles in Eastern Europe. U.S. officials in Moscow responded by saying that the unilateral move was propaganda that had come the day after the U.S. said that the Soviets had already placed 300 intermediate-range missiles Warsaw Pact nations and was constructing five additional bases.
- The U.S. sword-and-sorcery film Conan the Barbarian, the first based on the book series by Robert E. Howard and starring Arnold Schwarzenegger in the title role, had its world premiere in Spain (where it had been filmed) at the Fotogramas de Plata festival in Madrid. After being in release in Spain and France, it would be released in North American theaters on May 14, 1982.
- The film musical comedy Victor/Victoria, written and directed by Blake Edwards, adapted from the 1933 German film Victor and Victoria and starring his wife, Julie Andrews in the title role, had its premiere at the Filmex film festival in Los Angeles before opening in other North American cities on March 19.
- A made for television play, The Great American Fourth of July and Other Disasters, premiered on the PBS program American Playhouse. Set in the late 1940s and adapted from Jean Shepherd 1966 novel In God We Trust: All Others Pay Cash, the film starred actor Matt Dillon in the role of "Ralph Parker", and the characters would be seen again in the 1983 film A Christmas Story.
- Born: Dian Sastrowardoyo, Indonesian actress and model known for starring in the popular 2001 film Ada Apa Dengan Cinta? ("What's Up with Love?") and its 2009 sequel; in Jakarta

== March 17, 1982 (Wednesday) ==
- The nations of Bolivia and Chile severed all diplomatic relations after seven years of peace that had followed the signing of the Charaña Accord on February 8, 1975. While the treaty would have settled the Atacama Desert border dispute by Chile's cession of the port of Arica and land north of the Lluta River for a corridor from Bolivia to the sea, in exchange for Bolivia's cession of territory to Chile, the nation of Peru had the right of a veto under the 1929 Treaty of Lima.
- Four members of a Dutch television crew were killed by Salvadoran troops while traveling with leftist guerrillas as war correspondents for the Interkerkelijke Omroep Nederland (IKON) news service. The four men— Jacobus Andries "Koos" Koster, Jan Kuiper, Johannes Willemsen and Hans ter Laan— were near the town of Santa Rita in El Salvador's Chalatenango province to report on daily life in rebel held areas when their escorts opened fire on the Salvadoran Army unit.
- The first contingent of U.S. participants in a 3,000 member international peacekeeping force arrived in the Sinai arrived with 670 of a planned 1,200 U.S. Army troops.
- In India, the state of Kerala was placed under President's Rule after its Chief Minister and his cabinet resigned. The next day, the government of the state of Assam came under direct rule.
- Jean-Pierre Adams, a French professional footballer from 1967 to 1981, including 22 caps for the France national team, fell into a coma during surgery for a ligament rupture that he had sustained while playing for FC Chalon. Because of an error made by the anesthetist and a trainee, Adams suffered a bronchospasm and subsequent asphyxia and brain damage. He never regained consciousness and remained comatose for more than 39 years until his death on September 6, 2021.
- The documentary The Atomic Cafe, produced and directed by Kevin Rafferty, Jayne Loader and Pierce Rafferty, was given its premiere in New York City. It would later be selected for preservation by the U.S. National Film Registry.
- Born: Sumit Vats, Indian television actor known for starring in the soap opera Hitler Didi; in New Delhi

== March 18, 1982 (Thursday) ==
- The Israeli Civil Administration, which controlled the occupied the West Bank territory captured in 1967 during the Six-Day War, issued an order removing the Palestinian Arab mayor and city council members of the city of Al-Bireh from office, and announced that it would install a committee of Israeli administrators to govern the city. The action outraged the Palestinian population and was followed by a general strike in Al-Bireh, and which then spread to Bethlehem and Ramallah. By the next day, the strike and spread throughout the entire West Bank.
- A legal case brought on behalf of Mary Whitehouse against the National Theatre of Britain concerning alleged obscenity in the play The Romans in Britain, ended after the intervention of the Attorney General for England and Wales intervenes.
- The Belgian contemporary dance presentation Fase, choreographed by choreographer Anne Teresa De Keersmaeker, had its world premiere at the Beursschouwburg Theatre in Brussels.
- The BAFTA Awards for 1981 film, presented by the British Academy of Film and Television Arts, were given in a ceremony at the Hippodrome in London. Chariots of Fire won the BAFTA award for Best Film, while Burt Lancaster and Meryl Streep won Best Actor and Best Actress. The BAFTA Award ceremony took place 11 days before the Oscars were presented in the U.S. for films released in 1981.
- Singer and musician Teddy Pendergrass was left permanently paralyzed from the chest down when he lost control of his new Rolls-Royce Silver Spirit automobile and struck a tree at high speed. Pendergrass was operating the car on Lincoln Drive in the East Falls section of Philadelphia when he wrecked near Rittenhouse Street. He would return to performing concerts three years later and would live until almost 28 years after the accident before his death on January 13, 2010.
- The International Go Federation, supporting the strategic Japanese boardgame of go, was founded by go federations for 29 founding nations.
- Died:
  - Marshal Vasily Chuikov, 82, Soviet Russian military officer who led the defense of Stalingrad and later the Soviet counter-invasion of Nazi Germany
  - Sir Lawrence Wackett, 86, Australian aviator and aircraft designer
  - George More O'Ferrall, 74, British film and television producer and director

== March 19, 1982 (Friday) ==
- At the United Nations, Nicaragua's ambassador called for an urgent meeting of the UN Security Council to intervene in what it called "an imminent invasion" by American combat troops or by U.S.-trained paramilitary forces.
- The Indian state of Assam was placed under President's rule again upon the resignation of Chief Minister Keshab Chandra Gogoi, only two months after the previous six month rule had expired. The resumption of administration of the state by the national government would last almost one year, ending on February 27, 1983.
- Scrap metal workers from Argentina, whose group had been infiltrated by Marines from the South American nation, were delivered to Leith Harbour on the British-controlled South Georgia Island after being granted passage on the Argentine Navy transport ARA Bahía Buen Suceso. The marines had taken advantage of a contract between Britain and the Argentine entrepreneur Constantino Davidoff to tear down an abandoned whaling station on the island. Carrying out the first part of "Operation Alpha", the party raised the flag of Argentina and had established a camp by the time that they were found by investigators from the British Antarctic Survey, which had a station elsewhere on the island at Grytviken. The Antarctic surveyors informed British authorities who were at Stanley on the Falkland Islands, 870 miles (1,400 km) to the west, and the Royal Navy then dispatched the patrol vessel HMS Endurance to respond. Argentina's demonstration would be followed by an invasion of the Falkland Islands on April 2 by Argentine forces.
- An Illinois National Guard KC-135 Stratotanker jet exploded in mid-air at an altitude of 13,700 feet (4,200 m) while flying over Greenwood, Illinois, killing all 27 people on board. The aircraft, a military version of a Boeing 707, fell near Greenwood Elementary School, where school was not in session but about 400 people were attending the school's science fair. The aircraft had a crew of four but carried 23 members of the Air Force Reserve 928th Tactical Air Group passengers who had been scheduled for another flight that was canceled because of mechanical problems.
- The ballet Olga, composed by Yevhen Stankovych, with libretto by Yuriy Ilyenko, premiered at Kiev as part of a celebration the 1,500th anniversary of the founding in 482 of the Ukrainian capital. The plot was based on the life of Princess and Eastern Orthodox Saint Olga of Kiev.
- Born: Rezo Gigineishvili, Russian film director and producer known for Patient No. 1 (2023); in Tbilisi, Georgian SSR, Soviet Union
- Died:
  - J. B. Kripalani, 93, Indian politician and independence activist who was president of the Indian National Congress at the time of India's independence from the British Empire
  - William C. Lambert, 87, American fighter pilot who had 18 shoot downs in World War One, the second most by an American fighter ace.
  - Randy Rhoads, 25, American musician and guitarist for the Ozzy Osbourne band, was killed in a small plane crash along with the group's hairdresser, Rachel Youngblood, and its tour bus driver, Andy Aycock, who had been flying the plane. The group was in Leesburg, Florida, on their way to a concert the next day in Orlando when Aycock offered to take members on airplane rides. He was performing stunts and flew close to the Osbourne tour bus when a wing clipped the bus, then crashed into a nearby house. Osbourne and other occupants of the bus were uninjured.

== March 20, 1982 (Saturday) ==
- The world's largest oil producer, Saudi Arabia, joined other oil-exporting nations in agreeing to cut production effective April 1, after a two-day meeting of the OPEC nations, in a move to stop the falling prices of oil resulting from the high worldwide supply and decreasing demand.
- A crash killed all 27 people on a Garuda Indonesia airliner that overran the runway upon landing in Bandar Lampung during a heavy rain. The Fokker F28 jet, which had departed from Jakarta, caught fire after impact.
- In what is now India's state of Telangana, at least 59 people on a tourist bus were killed when the driver was crossing a railroad and the bus was struck by an express train. The accident occurred near the city of Kollapur while the train was traveling from Mangalore to New Delhi.
- The right-wing Konserwatiewe Party of South Africa was founded by Andries Treurnicht as he and 22 other disaffected parliament members from the ruling National Party who were opposed to any concessions to non-white South Africans in the white-minority nation's apartheid policy.
- Died: Jo Copeland, 84, American women's fashion designer known for the buttoned two-piece suit (1944)

== March 21, 1982 (Sunday) ==
- The United Auto Workers (UAW) labor union made concessions along with General Motors Corporation (GM) in reaching a 30-month contract, similar to the UAW concessions to the Ford Motor Company earlier in the year. GM called of its plans to close four factories or to lay off 11,000 workers, pledging to make no closings for two years, and the UAW agreed to give up worker benefits including guaranteed pay raises and an extension of paid vacations.
- In London, fares for riding the Underground, the British capital's subway system, were doubled after a court ruling banning subsidies that had helped cut the price by of a ride in October. The minimum underground fare rose from 20p to 40p, and journeys between zones increased even more, to 70 pence (equivalent to ₤3.29 in 2026, or US$4.40)
- Born:
  - Joshua Kutryk, Canadian astronaut; in Fort Saskatchewan, Alberta
  - Emilia Bashur, Bulgarian pop music and folk music recording artist; in Galabovo
- Died:
  - Harry H. Corbett, 57, English comedian best known for the being the son in the BBC sitcom Steptoe and Son (from 1962 to 1974) and for the films The Bargee (1964) and Carry On Screaming! (1966), died of a heart attack.
  - Mazlum Doğan, 23, Turkish Kurdish activist, committed suicide in the Diyarbakır Prison, where he had been incarcerated and tortured for more than two years.

== March 22, 1982 (Monday) ==
- The third flight of the American Space Shuttle Columbia was launched from Cape Canaveral with astronauts Jack Lousma and C. Gordon Fullerton, colonels in the U.S. Marines and U.S. Air Force, respectively. The mission was plagued with problems, but was the first to depart on the scheduled launch day, when it was witnessed by a crowd of 750,000 people.
- The Islamic Republic of Iran launched Operation Fath ol-Mobin, a large attack on Iraqi invaders who had reached the southern Iranian city of Shush. The Pasdaran and Basij brigades of Iran's Islamic Revolutionary Guard Corps, each with 1,000 fighters, were sent on a pincer movement to encircle the Iraqis. The attack came exactly 18 months after the September 22, 1980 launch of the Iran–Iraq War. Iranian Chinook helicopters landed behind Iraqi lines in a surprise attack and captured the Iraqi forces and their artillery.
- The U.S. State Department released a report to prove that the Soviet Union and its allies had used chemical warfare that killed more than 10,000 deaths various nations in Asia, including 3,000 people in 47 chemical attacks in Afghanistan since the invasion's start at the end of 1978. In addition, the report charged that the Communist regimes in Laos and Vietnam had used trichothecene and other chemical agents against Hmong rebels and killed at least 6,504 people in 261 separate attacks, and that the Khmer Rouge government in Cambodia had killed 981 people with lethal chemicals.
- A nitrate fire broke out in Mexico's film archive at the Cineteca Nacional in Mexico City, destroying reels from 6,506 productions from the "Golden Age of Mexican Cinema".
- The supernova SN 1982C, which had occurred in the NGC 4185 galaxy group more than 214 million years earlier, was observed from Earth for the first time. The discoverers on Earth was astronomers Béla Szeidl and Miklós Lovas of the Konkoly Observatory in Budapest.
- Died:
  - Harold Goldblatt, 82, British film and stage actor, director and producer
  - Ehsan Danish, 68, Pakistani Urdu language poet
  - Tex Palmer, 77, American film and television actor who appeared in more than 300 film westerns from 1932 to 1943 (including 33 in 1937 alone)

== March 23, 1982 (Tuesday) ==
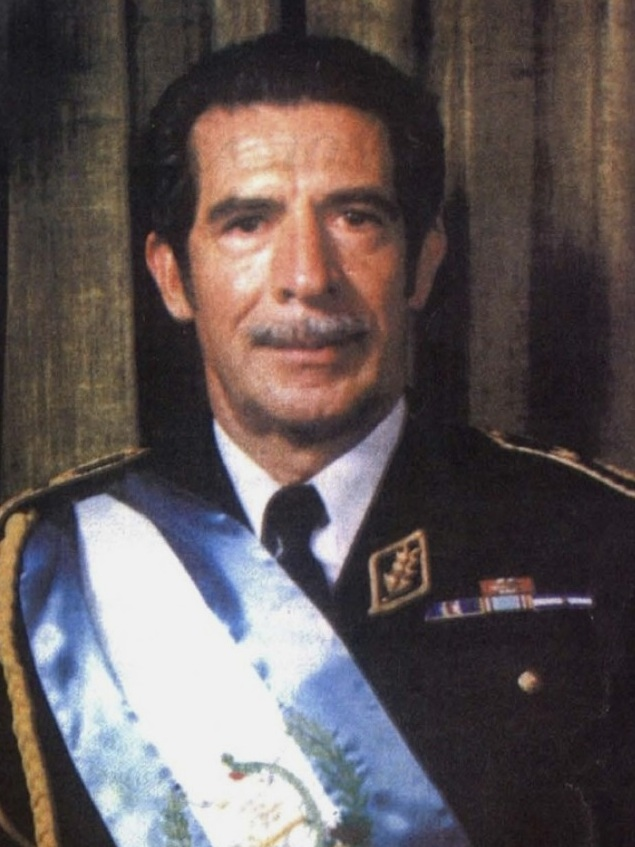
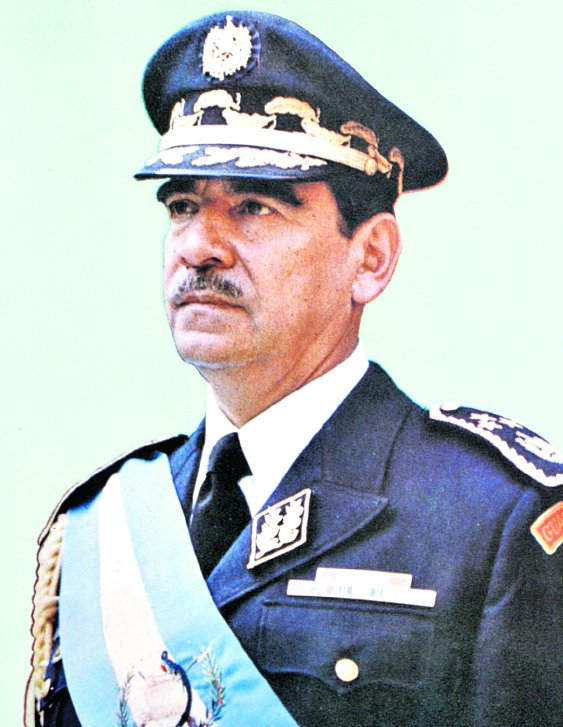
General Rios Montt overthrows Guatemalan president, General Lucas Garcia
- The government of Guatemala's president, General Romeo Lucas Garcia, was overthrown 16 days after an election had been held for a new president, and slightly more than three months before the scheduled July 1 inauguration of President-elect Ángel Aníbal Guevara. The Lucas regime was replaced by a three-man junta, headed by retired General Efrain Rios Montt, with the assistance of General Horacio Maldonado Schaad and Colonel Luis Gordillo Martinez. On the day of the coup, the Guatemalan Army carried out the massacre of 96 peasants in the village of Ilom.
- The government of Israel's Prime Minister Menachem Begin faced three consecutive motions of no confidence in the Knesset, with all three ending in a 58 to 58 tie. Although the coalition government led by Begin's Likud party was not required to dissolve the motion passed, Begin proposed that he and his cabinet should resign, but the cabinet ministers voted, 12 to 6, to remain in power.
- A supernova in the NGC 5679 triple galactic cluster was first seen on Earth, 400 million years after it occurred. It was discovered by astronomers Halton Arp and Jack W. Sulentic

== March 24, 1982 (Wednesday) ==
- In a coup d'état in Bangladesh, General Hussain Muhammad Ershad ousted President Abdus Sattar, ending three years of civilian rule in the Asian nation. In a radio broadcast, Ershad, who gave himself the title of martial law administrator, suspended the nation's constitution and instituted martial law, and said, "I am a soldier. My whole and sole aim is to reestablish democracy in accordance with the hopes and aspirations of the people," and pledged to appoint a civilian president and to hold elections "as soon as possible."
- The U.S. Senate voted unanimously, 94 to 0, to slow creation of new federal government regulations by adding a new step of cost-benefit analysis before publishing proposed regulations for "notice and comment", and required that independent agencies select the least costly method of attaining beneficial objectives. The U.S. Congress, for the first time, would have the power of a "legislative veto" (approved by a 69 to 25 vote) over a proposed regulation within 45 days of its publication, although the U.S. Department of Defense, the Federal Reserve System and the Securities and Exchange Commission would be exempt from being vetoed.
- Born:
  - Vino G. Bastian, Indonesian film actor and star of Serigala Terakhir ("Last Wolf", 2009), Miracle in Cell No. 7 (2022) and the Qodrat and Qodrat 2 film series; in Jakarta
  - Jimmy Siemers, American water skier; in Marshalltown, Iowa
- Died: Igor Gorin (stage name for Ignatz Greenberg), 77, Ukrainian-born opera baritone

== March 25, 1982 (Thursday) ==
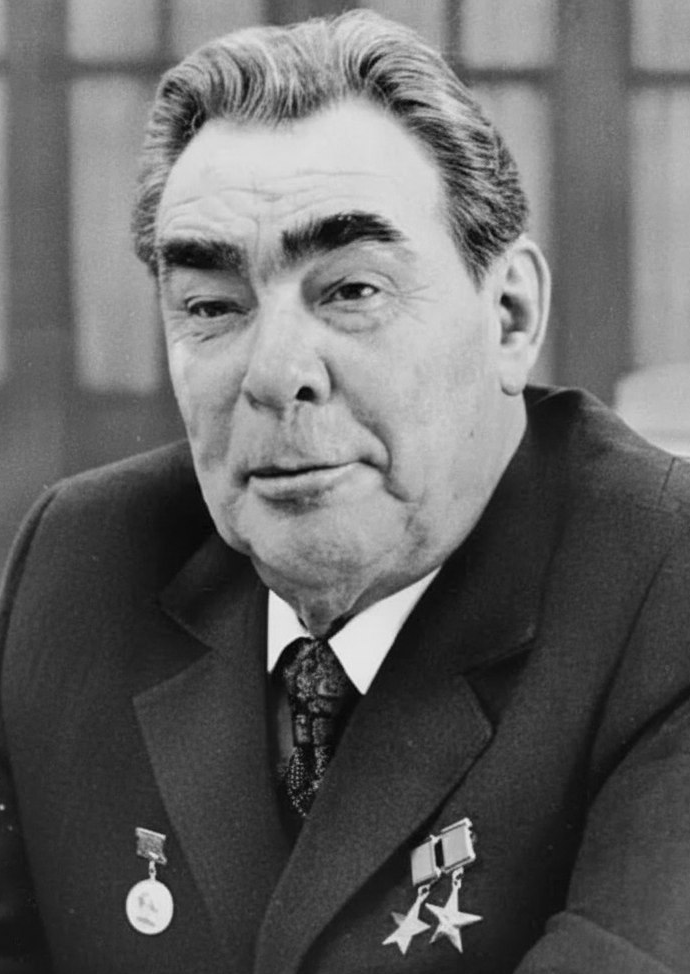
Soviet leader Brezhnev

- Leonid Brezhnev, the leader of the Soviet Union as First Secretary of the Soviet Communist Party and as Chairman of the Presidium of the Supreme Soviet, sustained a concussion and broken right clavicle when the scaffolding of an overcrowded catwalk fell on top of him and his bodyguards. Brezhnev was touring the Chkalov Aircraft Factory in Tashkent in the Uzbek SSR, and plant workers were on the scaffolding to greet him. Brezhnev, who was left in a coma, was flown back to Moscow in his Ilyushin Il-82 jet and taken to a hospital, where he remained in critical condition for several days. The accident and Brezhnev's injuries were kept secret by the Soviet press, with no television footage of his visit or his return, leading to speculation in the Western press that he had suffered a stroke.
- The Norfolk Southern Railway, at 17,860 miles (28,740 km) the third largest railway system in the United States, was created as the Interstate Commerce Commission approved the merger of the Norfolk and Western Railway and the Southern Railway.
- The day after taking power, Bangladesh leader Ershad announced the arrest of about 100 public officials on charges of corruption and his intent to have them tried by military courts.
- The championship of European professional basketball, the FIBA European Champions Cup, was won by Italy's champion, Pallacanestro Cantù, before a crowd of 8,000 people in the Sporthalle at Köln in West Germany. Cantù, based in a suburb of Milan, defeated Israel's champion, Maccabi Tel Aviv, 86 to 80.
- A 28-year-old chemical engineer in China, Xi Jinping, began his political career after having been a secretary for almost three years for Geng Biao, a member of the Politburo of the Chinese Communist Party, starting with his appointment as deputy party secretary for Zhengding, a county within China's Heibei Province. From there, he would become vice mayor of the city of Xiamen (1985), a deputy secretary for the Fujian Province CCP committee (1988), an alternate CCP Central Committee member (1997), Governor of Fujian Province (2000), a full member of the CCP Central Committee (2002), and Vice President of China in 2008. On November 15, 2012, Xi would become the de facto leader of the People's Republic of China as General Secretary of the Chinese Communist Party.
- Born: Danica Patrick, American IndyCar and NASCAR driver known for being the most successful woman in automobile racing, Indianapolis 500 Rookie of the Year in 2005, third place finisher in the 2008 Indianapolis 500; in Beloit, Wisconsin
- Died: Harold DeMarsh, 80, known for becoming, in 1928, the first NCAA wrestling champion when the inaugural college tournament was held.

== March 26, 1982 (Friday) ==
- The Andrew Lloyd Webber musical Song and Dance premiered on London's West End at the Palace Theatre for the first of 781 performances.
- In Colombia, the crash of Aeropesca Flight 217 into a mountain near Quetame and killed all 21 people aboard. The Vickers Viscount turboprop was carrying 15 passengers and a crew of six from Villavicencio to Bogotá and struck a mountain at an altitude of 7,700 feet (2,300 m) and 39 miles (63 km) from its destination.
- In Spain, voting was held for the newly created Parliament of Andalusia, after Andalusia had been granted autonomy by the Spanish government. Of the 109 seats, the PSOE-A socialist workers' party of Rafael Escuredo won 66 for a majority.
- Born: Leka Zogu, Albanian government official and pretender to the throne of the monarchy of Albania (as King Leka II to monarchists) since the death of his father, Leka, Crown Prince of Albania, in 2011; in Johannesburg, South Africa
- Died:
  - Sam Kydd, 67, British actor who appeared in 290 films in his career and as the title character in the ITV children's television series Orlando from 1965 to 1968, died from emphysema.
  - Sultan al-Atrash, 91, Druze Syrian independence fighter who led the Great Syrian Revolt from 1925 to 1927
  - Jack Malloch, 61, South African-born bush pilot and gun-runner, was killed on the last day of filming of a documentary film, Pursuit of a Dream, when he crashed during a thunderstorm in a restored Mk 22 Spitfire airplane.

== March 27, 1982 (Saturday) ==
- A. F. M. Ahsanuddin Chowdhury was appointed as the new President of Bangladesh by General H. M. Ershad, who had overthrown the government three days earlier.
- The KBO League, the first professional baseball league in South Korea, began its inaugural season with six teams. President Chun Doo-hwan threw out the ceremonial first pitch at Dongdaemun Stadium in Seoul as MBC Chungyong hosted the Samsung Lions of Daegu, with the Lions winning, 11 to 7. The other teams in the first season were the Haitai Tigers (Gwangju), the Lotte Giants (Busan, the OB Bears (Daejon) and the Sammi Superstars (Inchon)
- The North Dakota Fighting Sioux won the NCAA Ice Hockey championship, defeating the Wisconsin Badgers, 5 to 2, before a crowd of 9,752 in Providence, Rhode Island.
- The German Doppelkopf Association (Deutsche Doppelkopf-Verband or DDV) was founded to govern the play of the German four-player card game doppelkopf, at Braunschweig by representatives of 16 doppelkopf clubs.
- Born: Kinda Alloush, Syrian actress in Egyptian and Syrian film, known for the drama Nezouh (2022) and the comedy Excuse My French (2014); in Damascus
- Died:
  - Fazlur R. Khan, 52, Bangladeshi and American structural engineer for his innovations in skyscraper construction, died from a heart attack. Khan was the creator of particularly tubular design, first implemented in 1966 and now in use for most buildings over 40 stories in height, and the principal designer of the Willis Tower, which was, at the time of his death, the Sears Tower, tallest building in the world.
  - Harriet Adams, 89, American author of multiple children's detective and adventure novel series under various pen names, notably Nancy Drew (as Carolyn Keene), The Hardy Boys (as Franklin W. Dixon), Tom Swift (as Victor Appleton) and The Bobbsey Twins (as Laura Lee Hope)
  - John Addey, 61, British astrologer known for postulating Addey's Theory of Harmonics in 1976. His biography noted that "he was born on 15 June 1920 at 8.15 am and died at 5.17 pm on 27 March 1982"
  - Hubert Schiffer, 66, German Jesuit priest and survivor of the August 6, 1945, atomic bombing of Hiroshima. Schiffer and three of his colleagues were at their mission, the Jesuit Church of Our Lady's Assumption, 1.3 kilometres (0.81 mi) from the blast site.

== March 28, 1982 (Sunday) ==
- Two separate women's college basketball champions were crowned in the United States as Louisiana Tech won the first NCAA Division I women's tournament in Norfolk, Virginia, defeating Cheyney State College, 76 to 62, and Rutgers University beat the University of Texas, 83 to 77, in the last tournament of the Association for Intercollegiate Athletics for Women (AIAW), in Philadelphia.
- Elections were held in El Salvador for a 60-seat Constitutional Assembly that would then elect a new president for the Central American nation. The Christian Democrat party of the Salvadoran head of state, junta leader Jose Napoleon Duarte, won 24 seats, but the nation's five conservative parties combined for a majority of seats.
- Died: William Giauque, 86, Canadian-born U.S. chemist and recipient of the 1949 Nobel Prize in Chemistry

== March 29, 1982 (Monday) ==
- Royal Assent was given by Queen Elizabeth II to the Canada Act 1982, setting the stage for the repatriation of the Canadian Constitution that would take place on April 17.
- The 54th Academy Awards, hosted by Johnny Carson, were held at the Dorothy Chandler Pavilion in Los Angeles. Chariots of Fire won four Oscars, including the Academy Award for Best Picture. Henry Fonda and Katharine Hepburn, co-stars of On Golden Pond, won the awards for Best Actor and Best Actress.
- The North Carolina Tar Heels defeated the Georgetown Hoyas, 63 to 62, to win the NCAA men's basketball championship, played at the Louisiana Superdome in New Orleans. The winning shot was made by North Carolina freshman Michael Jordan with 17 seconds remaining.
- Five people were killed and 28 injured by a time bomb in a passenger car of the Le Capitole high-speed train as it was traveling in France from Paris to Toulouse. The train was carrying more than 300 people at more than 85 miles per hour (137 km/h) when the bomb exploded between the towns of Ambazac and La Jonchère-Saint-Maurice in the Haute-Vienne département.
- Born: Anupam Roy, Indian Bengali composer for film soundtracks; in Kolkata
- Died:
  - Walter Hallstein, 80, German statesman and advocate for European unity who served as the first President of the European Commission, now the executive body of the European Union, from 1958 to 1967
  - USAF General Nathan F. Twining, 84, Chairman of the Joint Chiefs of Staff from 1957 to 1960 and previously chief of staff of the U.S. Air Force
  - Charles Allen Thomas, 82, American chemist, inventor and entrepreneur
  - Helene Deutsch, 97, Hungarian-born American psychoanalyst of Polish ancestry
  - Ray Bloch, 79, American composer and orchestra conductor for The Ed Sullivan Show
  - Carl Orff, 86, German composer and music educator, known for the Orff Schulwerk method of teaching music to children, and for the Carmina Burana cantata

== March 30, 1982 (Tuesday) ==
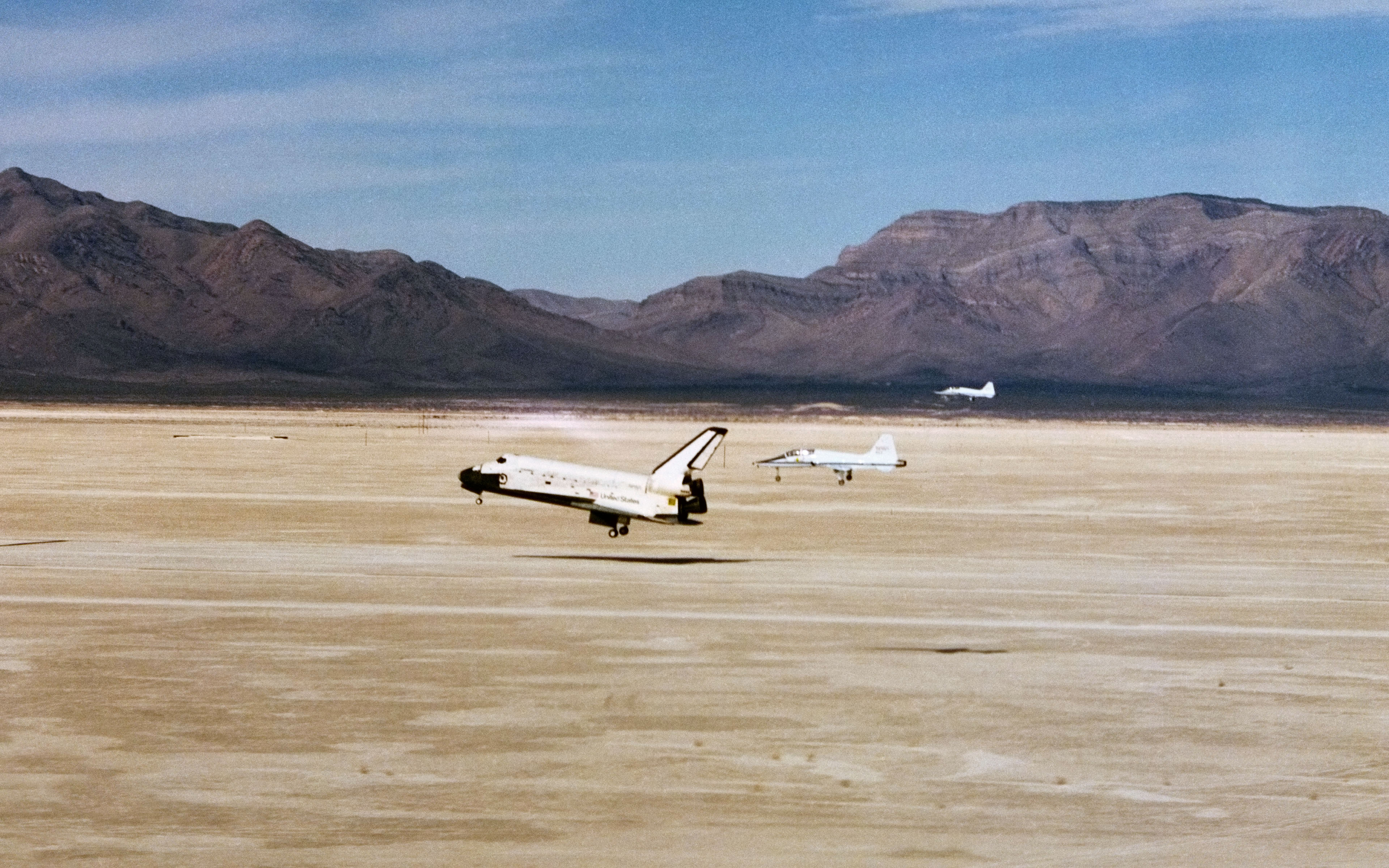
Columbia landing in New Mexico

- Space Shuttle Columbia ended its third mission the eight-day long STS-3. For the first and only time in the history of the shuttle, the spacecraft landed in New Mexico at the White Sands Space Harbor, near Alamogordo, rather than the originally planned landing site, Edwards Air Force Base in California.
- The El Chichon volcano near Nicapa in the Mexican state of Chiapas erupted, killing at least 10 people, injuring 200 others and forcing 20,000 to flee their homes.
- A large paratrooper airdrop in the California desert killed four U.S. Army soldiers and injured at least 71, 11 of whom were hospitalized.
- Tens of thousands of Argentinians participated in a demonstration in the Plaza de Mayo in Buenos Aires in a protest against the nation's military government, and thousands were arrested and detained.
- The Royal Navy submarine HMS Spartan was ordered to travel to the Falkland Islands in the South Atlantic Ocean after British intelligence determined that Argentina was preparing to launch an invasion.
- Ekiti State University was established in the city of Ado-Ekiti in Nigeria as Obafemi Awolowo University. It would have an enrollment of more than 27,000 students after 40 years.
- The Habou-Béné, the largest shopping complex in the West African nation of Niger and located at its capital, Niamey, was destroyed by a fire. It would take more than five years for the government of Niger to rebuild the market.
- The John Pielmeier play Agnes of God opened on Broadway at the Music Box Theatre for the first of 599 performances.
- Died:
  - Agnes Newton Keith, 80, American writer known for her autobiographical book Three Came Home, an account of her internment in a Japanese prison camp during Japan's occupation of North Borneo; Claudette Colbert portrayed Keith in the film adaptation of the same name in 1950.
  - Violet King Henry, 52, the first black woman to be licensed as a lawyer in Canada, died from cancer.
  - Sergio Grieco, 65, Italian film director and screenwriter who also used the pen name Terence Hathaway, known for Grieco films such as Julius Caesar Against the Pirates (Giulio Cesare contro i pirati)(1962), and the Hathaway film Agent 077: Mission Bloody Mary (1965) and its sequel, Agent 077: From the Orient with Fury

== March 31, 1982 (Wednesday) ==
- Six of the 10 members of the ruling Politburo of the Communist Party of Vietnam were removed from their jobs, including General Vo Nguyen Giap, who had led Communist forces in North Vietnam in defeating French and American forces over nearly 30 years, as well as foreign minister Nguyen Duy Trinh, economic planner Le Thanh Nghi, former interior minister Tran Quoc Hoan and peace negotiator Xuan Thuy. The de facto ruler, Communist Party First Secretary Le Duan, retained his post along with President Truong Chinh, Prime Minister Pham Van Dong, Interior Minister Pham Hung and peace negotiator Le Duc Tho.
- A freighter from Haiti sank in the Gulf of Mexico, killing at least 20 refugees who were being smuggled into the United States by the crew. Although the six survivors of the ship claimed that there had been only 10 people aboard, bodies began washing ashore on beaches in Broward County, Florida.
- The CIGNA insurance and healthcare management company was created by the merger of Connecticut General Life Insurance Company (CG) and the Insurance Company of North America (INA).
- Royal Navy Admiral Henry Leach, aware of intelligence reports that Argentina was preparing to invade the British-held Falkland Islands, bypassed the Secretary of State for Defence, Sir John Nott, and met directly with Prime Minister Margaret Thatcher to persuade her to authorize war with Argentina. Almost 30 years later, upon Leach's death, the press reported that he told the Prime Minister that if Britain failed to immediately retake the Falklands, then "in another few months we shall be living in a different country whose word counts for little." Thatcher approved preparations to send two aircraft carriers in the event of an invasion, which occurred two days after their meeting.
- The Canal Zone Police, a force of more than 400 officers during American control of the Panama Canal Zone, was disbanded pursuant to the 1977 treaty between the U.S. and Panama. U.S. law enforcement within the zone was turned over to the control of the Republic of Panama.
- The U.S. Supreme Court voted, 6 to 3, to reverse a 1980 appellate court ruling that had set aside the conviction Dr. Jeffrey MacDonald for the 1970 murder of his wife and two daughters. Within three hours, MacDonald was arrested at his home in Huntington Beach, California and sent back to federal prison. He had been free to practice emergency medicine since the 1980 decision.
- The Hong Kong action film comedy Carry On Pickpocket, directed by Sammo Hung and starring Hung, Frankie Chan, Deanie Ip and Richard Ng
- Born:
  - Chloe Zhao, Chinese film director who became the second woman to win the Academy Award for Best Director, which she received for her 2020 American film Nomadland, which also won the award for Best Picture; as Zhao Ting, in Beijing
  - Brian Tyree Henry, American television, stage and film actor; in Fayetteville, North Carolina
- Died:
  - Dave Clement, 34, English footballer for Wimbledon F.C. but primarily for Queens Park Rangers, from 1965 until his death, as well as five games in 1976 and 1977 for the England national team, committed suicide.
  - Joe Dundee (ring name for Salvatore Lazzara), 78, Italian-born American boxer who was the world welterweight champion from 1927 to 1929
  - Yacov Barsimantov, Israeli diplomat who was second secretary of Israel's Embassy in France, was shot to death in the lobby of his apartment building in the Paris suburb of Boulogne-Billancourt. A terrorist group, the Lebanese Armed Revolutionary Factions took responsibility for the murder. The shooting, followed two months later by the wounding of Israel's ambassador to the United Kingdom on June 3, would lead to Israel's invasion of Lebanon.
