= February 1982 =

Month of 1982

<<	February 1982					>>
Su	Mo	Tu	We	Th	Fr	Sa
	1	2	3	4	5	6
7	8	9	10	11	12	13
14	15	16	17	18	19	20
21	22	23	24	25	26	27
28

The following events occurred in February 1982:

== February 1, 1982 (Monday) ==
- The Senegambia Confederation was created as a partial union of the two West African nations of Senegal and The Gambia, pursuant to an agreement signed on December 12. After Gambia declined to move toward a closer union, Senegal would end the Confederation on September 10, 1989.
- The American television show Late Night with David Letterman premiered at 12:30 in the morning on NBC and began an 11-year run which would end in 1993 with Letterman's transfer to the CBS network and the premiere of The Late Show with David Letterman.
- The most powerful commercial computer chip up to that time, the Intel 80286, was introduced by the Intel company, with the power to expand a computer memory to 16 megabytes, compared to the one megabyte 8086.
- Born:
  - Gavin Henson, Welsh professional rugby union player with 33 caps for the Wales national team; in Pencoed, Mid Glamorgan
  - Andrea Minguzzi, Italian Greco-Roman wrestling champion and 2008 Olympic gold medalist; in Castel San Pietro Terme
  - Sandra Linkevičienė, Lithuanian women's basketball player and EuroLeague star; in Kretinga, Lithuanian SSR, Soviet Union

== February 2, 1982 (Tuesday) ==
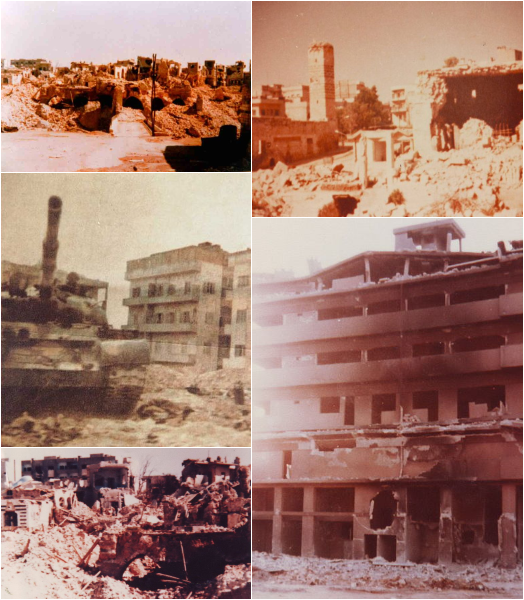
Images of the destruction of Hama

- The Hama massacre began in Syria as the Syrian army worked on suppressing a rebellion by the Muslim Brotherhood in the Syrian city. The government of President Hafez Assad was dominated by Alawite Muslims while the brotherhood was largely composed of Sunni Muslims. On the first day of the massacre, the members of a government security force were killed while trying to raid a Brotherhood hangout. Within three weeks, Hama, Syria's fifth larrgest city, was in ruins.
- Belgium's Senate joined the January 18 vote by Chamber of Deputies to grant Prime Minister Wilfried Martens power to enact economic reforms by decree for the remainder of the year.
- A Cuban hijacker took control of Air Florida Flight 710, a Boeing 737 jetliner with 77 people on board, shortly after the Boeing 737 took off from Miami to Key West. After the jet landed in Havana, the passengers and rew were returned to Miami later in the day.
- In the U.S., the Jet Propulsion Laboratory announced that a new analysis had discovered at least four more small moons orbiting Saturn, bringing the number of known Saturnian satellites to 21.
- Born:Filippo Magnini, Italian competitive swimmer and world champion in the 100m freestyle event in 2005 and 2007; in Pesaro

== February 3, 1982 (Wednesday) ==
- Syria's President Hafez al-Assad ordered the nation's army to purge the Muslim Brotherhood from the city of Harran. Estimates of deaths and disappearances from a bombing campaign range from 10,000 to 40,000 civilians.
- Leonid Brezhnev, head of state of the Soviet Union and First Secretary of the Soviet Communist Party, presented an arms-control plan for both the USSR and the U.S. to reduce their nuclear weapons in Europe by two-thirds. The next day, U.S. President Ronald Reagan announced the American plan for elimination by both sides of all nuclear missiles in Europe.
- All 36 people aboard a French Foreign Legion chartered Nord 2501 Noratlas airplane were killed when the aircraft crashed into the side of Mount Garbi following takeoff from Djibouti. The victims were mostly members of a platoon of the 2nd Foreign Parachute Regiment.
- The highest ranking Soviet military officer in the Soviet embassy in Washington was expelled from the United States after being declared persona non grata by the U.S. Department of State. Major General Vasily Chitov had been taken into custody by the FBI after a high-speed car chase, after which he had been found with incriminating documents, but released without being arrested for espionage because of diplomatic immunity.
- The popular video game Ms. Pac-Man, a sequel to Namco's Pac-Man, was introduced at a press conference at Sherman Oaks, California, by an American company, General Computer Corporation, following a licensing agreement with Namco.
- The Eastman Kodak Company unveiled its new product, the disk camera, which used a disk cartridge rather than rolls of film. The lowest priced model, the Disc 4000, had a suggested retail price of $67.95, equivalent to $204 forty-years later in 2022.
- Born:
  - Jalal Hosseini, Iranian footballer with 115 caps for the Iran national team; in Bandar Anzali
  - Vera Brezhneva (stage name for Vira Viktorivna Halushka), Ukrainian singer and actress; in Dniprodzerzhynsk, Ukrainian SSR, Soviet Union
- Died: Anton Hartman, 63, South African conductor for the South African Broadcasting Corporation, and professor at the University of the Witwatersrand

== February 4, 1982 (Thursday) ==
- Henk Chin A Sen was dismissed from his figurehead position as President of Suriname by Dési Bouterse, who had taken over leadership of the South American nation in a 1980 military coup. Bouterse installed Fred Ramdat Misier as the new president.
- Sri Lanka's President J. R. Jayewardene announced that presidential elections would be held for the first time in the island nation, to take place on October 20.
- The Broadway musical Pump Boys and Dinettes held the first of 573 performances, premiering at the Princess Theatre and running until June 18, 1983.
- Died:
  - Alex Harvey, 46, Scottish rock and blues musician known for leading The Sensational Alex Harvey Band, died from a heart attack in Belgium shortly after completing a European concert tour.
  - Kenichi Yamamoto, 56, Japanese yakuza crime boss and successor to Kazuo Taoka, died of liver disease six months after Taoka's death.
  - Konrad Morgen, 72, Nazi German investigating judge and SS officer who prosecuted corruption and illegal acts (which he defined as those not authorized directly by Adolf Hitler) within the organization, later a witness for the prosecution in the Nuremberg trials before resuming his judicial career in West Germany
  - Marion S. Wyeth, 92, American architect known for designing (in 1924) the Mar-a-Lago mansion in Palm Beach, Florida, originally for Marjorie Merriweather Post, later used by U.S. president Donald Trump

== February 5, 1982 (Friday) ==
- Based in London, the low-cost airline Laker Airways halted operations, leaving 6,000 passengers stranded and debts of £270 million. All flights were canceled and in one case, a flight that had already departed with309 passengers from London to the Canary Islands "was called back, apparently out of concern that it might be seized abroad to satisfy debts."
- An airplane crash killed all 53 people on board a Republic of Korea Air Force C-123 Provider transport during a training mission. Along with its crew of six, the airplane was transporting 47 members of the ROK Army's special forces, the 707th Special Mission Group and was approaching the airport on Jeju Island when it struck the ground near Mount Halla.
- The government of West Germany, led by Chancellor Helmut Schmidt, won a vote of confidence by a margin of 269 to 226.

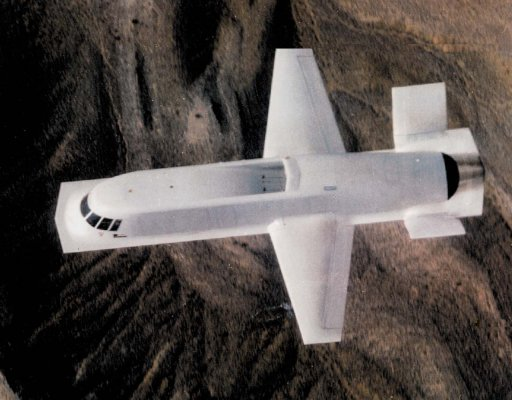
The Tacit Blue stealth plane

- The Tacit Blue stealth aircraft, developed by the Northrop Corporation, secretly made its first flight, conducted at the U.S. Air Force Area 51 within the remote Nevada Test and Training Range and flown by test pilot Richard G. Thomas. The aircraft's existence would remain a secret until the Tacit Blue project's declassification on April 30, 1996.
- At the conclusion of an emergency special session of the United Nations General Assembly to consider Israel's December 17 annexation of the Golan Heights, captured from Syria during the 1967 Six-Day War, the Assembly voted, 86 to 21, to approve General Assembly Resolution 37/123A, a non-binding resolution calling for an international boycott of Israel.
- Iran held its first annual International Holy Quran Competition, with competitors from 12 nations showing their skills in memorizing the entirety of the central religious text of Islam, the Quran, and in reciting the Tahqiq.
- The Mask, a popular series of comic books that would be adapted for a popular 1994 film and a syndicated television cartoon, was created by freelance author and artist Mike Richardson.
- Born:
  - Jenn Suhr, American pole vaulter and 2012 Olympic gold medalist for the women's pole vault; in Fredonia, New York
  - Rodrigo Palacio, Argentine footballer with 27 caps for the Argentina national team; in Bahia Blanca
  - Filippo Strocchi, Italian stage actor and singer; in Modena
- Died:
  - Dr. Neil Aggett, white South African labor leader, was found hanged in his jail cell.
  - Peter Opie, 63, English children's forklorist who, with his wife, Iona Balfour Opie, wrote multiple literary analyses of children's folklore, including The Oxford Dictionary of Nursery Rhymes (Oxford University Press, 1951), The Lore and Language of Schoolchildren (1959), and The Classic Fairy Tales (1974)
  - Grigori Shneyerov Schneerson, 79, Soviet Russian musicologist and author known for his studies and criticism of music produced in China, the U.S., England, France, and Germany.

== February 6, 1982 (Saturday) ==
- American spree killer Robert Dale Henderson, who had murdered 12 people in a three week period from January 14 to February 4, approached a deputy sheriff at the Aqui Esta Shopping Center at Punta Gorda, Florida and voluntarily surrendered to Charlotte County deputy sheriff Curtis Moore. Gordon would be executed in the electric chair at the Florida State Prison on April 21, 1993.
- In the Philippines, the populist political party Partido Demokratiko Pilipino (Philippine Democratic Party') was founded in Cebu City by Aquilino "Nene" Pimentel and other people in opposition to both the government of President Ferdinand Marcos and Marcos' ruling party, the KBL Kilusang Bagong Lipunan (KBL). In 1983, PDB would merge with the Laban to form the party PDP-Laban of Benigno Aquino, which took a majority of seats in the Philippine House of Representatives and the Philippine Senate in elections in 1987.
- U.S. President Reagan announced the federal budget of $757.6 billion for Fiscal Year 1983 (to run from October 1, 1982 to September 30, 1983), and a 91.5 billion dollar increase in the deficit to take effect in his "New Federalism" policy of transferring payment for social welfare programs to the individual U.S. states.
- Challenger Amado Ursua of Mexico defeated WBC junior flyweight boxing champion Hilario Zapata by a knockout in the second round in a bout in Panama City to win the World Boxing Council world championship. Ursua would only hold the title for two months and one week, losing to Tadashi Tomori of Japan on April 13, 1982.

== February 7, 1982 (Sunday) ==
- Elections were held in Costa Rica of the president and for the 57-member legislative assembly. Luis Alberto Monge of the National Liberation Party was elected President of Costa Rica, receiving more votes than the other five candidates combined. Rafael Calderon Fournier, finished well behind, with 35% of the vote.
- Australia's women's cricket team won the third Women's Cricket World Cup by three wickets, defeating England's team, 152/7 to 151/5 in the final at Christchurch, New Zealand, at the end of the five team competition that featured a championship game for the first time.
- The Iraqi soccer football club Al-Shorta won the 1982 Arab Club Champions Cup with a 4–2 aggregate victory over Al-Nejmeh in the final.
- The guerrilla movement Unidad Revolucionaria Nacional Guatemalteca (URNG, Guatemalan National Revolutionary Unity) was founded as an anti-government movement to combat the Guatemalan Army in its actions of killing the Mayan people in the Central American nation.
- Born: Nicola Spirig, Swiss lawyer and 2012 Olympic gold medalist for the women's pole vault; in Winkel, Canton of Zurich.
- Died: Roy W. Chappell, 85, British flying ace with 11 aerial victories in World War One

== February 8, 1982 (Monday) ==
- A pre-dawn fire at the Hotel New Japan in Tokyo killed 32 people and injured 60 others. The fire broke out at shortly after 3:00 a.m. in Room 938 of the hotel.
- The crash an Indian Air Force military transport plane killed in bad weather killed all 23 people aboard. The C-119 "Flying Boxcar" was flying from Pathankot in the Punjab state to Leh in the Jammu and Kashmir union territory when it went down near the village of Lohai Malhar.
- The Islamic Revolutionary Guard Corps of Iran located and raided the safe house used by the anti-government People's Mojahedin of Iran (MEK) militia and, after a three-hour long firefight, killed multiple occupants, including MEK's commander, Mousa Khiabani, his wife Azar Reazei, and the female commander Ashraf Rabiei.
- Fred Ramdat Misier was appointed to the figurehead position of President of Suriname by Colonel Dési Bouterse, leader of the Surinamese military.
- Philippine special forces freed Tommy Manotoc, son-in-law of President Ferdinand Marcos, from captivity after a raid on the headquarters of the Maoist New People's Army. Manotoc had been kidnapped on December 9, almost six weeks earlier.
- Born: Zersenay Tadese, Eritrean long-distance runner who held the world record for the half marathon from 2010 to 2018; in Adi Bana
- Died:
  - John Hay Whitney, 77, American venture capital lender, publisher and diplomat, who founded J. H. Whitney & Company, served as U.S. Ambassador to the United Kingdom from 1957 to 1961, published the New York Herald Tribune and served as president of the Museum of Modern Art
  - Henry S. Morgan, 81, American banker and co-founder (with Harold Stanley) of the Morgan Stanley financial services firm in 1935

== February 9, 1982 (Tuesday) ==
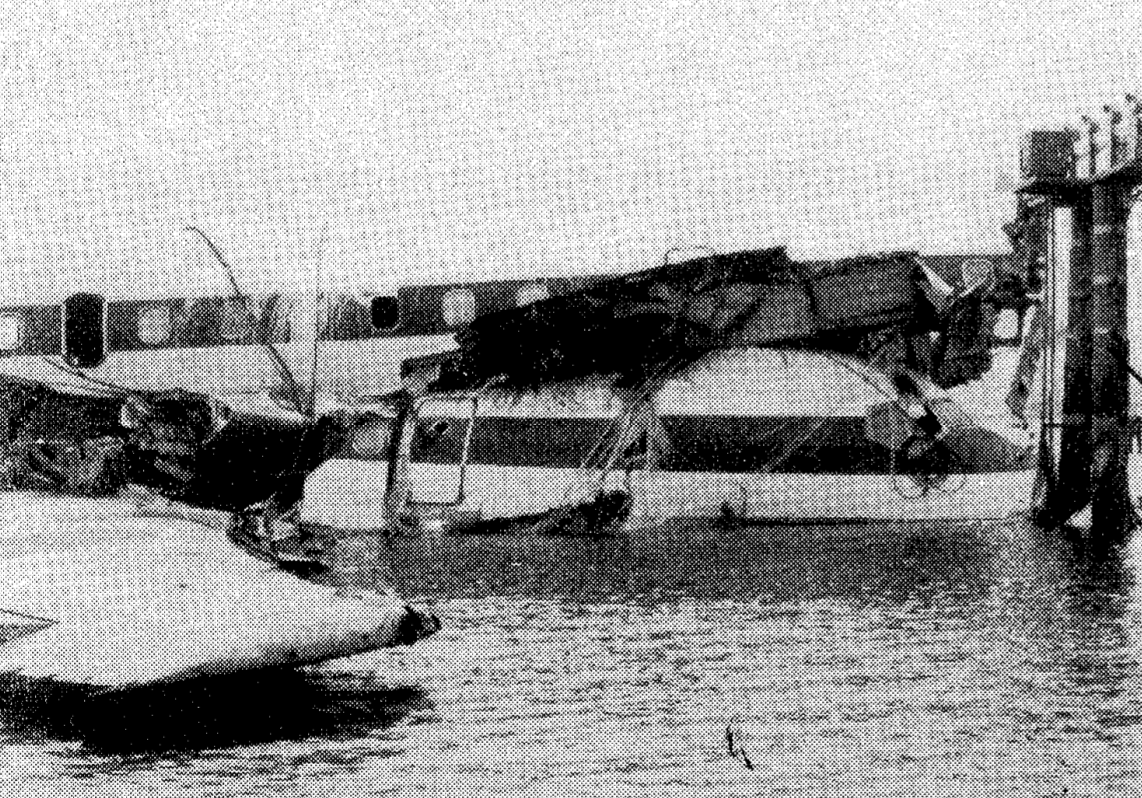
Japan Airlines jet in Tokyo Bay

- The pilot of Japan Airlines Flight 350, Seiji Katagiri, deliberately plunged the airliner into Tokyo Bay by shifting the controls into a thrust reversal as the DC-8 jet was approaching Tokyo for a landing. The crash killed 24 of the 174 people on board. Investigators determined from the cockpit voice recorder that Katagiri had shifted the controls in an evident suicide attempt, and that co-pilot Yoshifumi Ishikawa had unsuccessfully tried to bring the plane out of a nose-dive while flight engineer Yoshimi Ozaki fought with Katagiri. All three of the flight crew survived. Katagiri was charged with the homicide, but found to have paranoid schizophrenia and acquitted by reason of insanity.
- Chan Sy took office as the new Prime Minister of Cambodia by the Vietnamese supported government, formally replacing premier Pen Sovan who had been deposed on December 5.
- Kai Mierendorff, the former leader of a West German organization that had helped more than 1,000 paying customers to escape from East Germany, was injured by a letter bomb sent to his hotel in Munich.

== February 10, 1982 (Wednesday) ==
- A consortium of French banks, with the approval of the government of France, announced its loan of $140 million to the Soviet Union to finance purchase of French equipment for building a natural gas pipeline that would bring natural from Siberia to Western Europe.
- Born: Justin Gatlin, American sprinter and 2004 Olympic gold medalist for the 100-meter race; in Brooklyn
- Died: Margrit Rainer, 68, Swiss comedienne and actress on stage and in film, died from complications of surgery.

== February 11, 1982 (Thursday) ==
- The government of France nationalized five major industrial groups and 39 private banks as Prime Minister Pierre Mauroy signed the "industrial nationalization bill" into law, with the government to pay seven billion dollars as compensation to the acquired companies.
- Czechoslovak police arrested Ladislav Hojer, a Czech serial killer and cannibal charged with the killing of at least five women between 1978 and 1981. Hojer would be hanged in Pankrac Prison in 1986.
- Italy's Parliament approved a $12,000,000 project to prevent the leaning Tower of Pisa from toppling, including the installation of an electric pump to maintain the water pressure in underground pools beneath the monument. The Tower would be closed to the public while the project was being completed.
- Corsican nationalists led by Charles Pieri of the terrorist National Liberation Front of Corsica (FLNC) attacked a French Foreign Legion outpost in the town of Sorbo-Ocagnano, killing an Italian legionnaire and ending the temporary truce between the FLNC and the French government.
- Born:
  - Neil Robertson, Australian professional snooker world champion; in Melbourne
  - Natalie Dormer, British film actress; in Reading, Berkshire
  - Ilia Novikov, Russian and Ukrainian criminal defense attorney, later accused by the Russian regime as a foreign agent and a terrorist; in Moscow
  - Efraín Villanueva, Colombian journalist and author; in Barranquilla
- Died:
  - Takashi Shimura, 76, Japanese film actor, known for being in 21 Akira Kurosawa films, including as the star of Drunken Angel (1948) and Ikiru (1952)
  - Albert Facey, 87, Australian writer known for A Fortunate Life
  - Erich Maschke, 81, German historian known for chairing West Germany's Maschke Commission from 1957 to 1962 to investigate treatment of German prisoners-of-war by Allied nations during World War Two, committed suicide following the death of his wife.

== February 12, 1982 (Friday) ==
- The Communist government of Poland began a two-day operation to test compliance with the rules implemented in December during martial law, and arrested 145,000 people across the nation. In announcing the results, Poland's government news agency, PAP, reported that 99,000 were let off with a warning, 29,000 more were cautioned, and 3,500 taken to their local police station for further questioning.
- In the Philippines, the Ilaga terrorist group killed 12 people in the city of Dumingag in Zamboanga del Sur province, in reprisal for the killing of their leader by the Communist New People's Army.
- A major strike took place in Portugal and police arrested a group of men in a car loaded with explosives and assault weapons, along with pamphlets callinf gor the overthrow of the government. Interior Minister Angelo Correia appeared on television the next day to accuse unions of attempting to overthrow the government of Prime Minister Franciso Pinto Balsemao.
- Died: Victor Jory, 79, Canadian-born American stage, film and TV actor

== February 13, 1982 (Saturday) ==
- A group of 55 men and 19 women was executed by Guatemalan government sponsored Civil Patrol members, who had confiscated their government identity cards and then directed them to the city of Xococ to recover the documents. The victims, mostly Mayan people, were among 440 men, women and children killed in Rio Negro from 1980 to 1982.
- Pope John Paul II made his first trip outside of Italy since having been wounded in an assassination attempt, beginning an 8-day tour of West African nations starting with a flight to Lagos, capital of Nigeria, where he was greeted by President Shehu Shagari.
- In the U.S., the Ford Motor Company and the United Auto Workers reached a historic labor agreement that provide the first concessions by the UAW for relief for Ford's financial problems (including a freeze on wage levels for 30 months and a reduction by two weeks of paid leave, in return for a guarantee of a lifetime paycheck as protection against future layoffs.
- Ossie Ocasio defeated Robbie Williams in a 15-round bout to win the first World Boxing Association cruiserweight (or junior heavyweight) (maximum 190 lb weight) title in a 15-round outdoor bout before 25,000 fans in Johannesburg in South Africa.
- Died:
  - Zeng Jinlian, 17, Chinese girl who had been, at the time of her death, the tallest person in the world, standing 8 feet and 1 inch (246 centimeters) tall
  - Brother Leo William Miller, 37, Amerrican missionary and Roman Catholic martyr, was shot by masked men in the city of Huehuetenango in Guatemala and later declared a Roman Catholic martyr.

== February 14, 1982 (Sunday) ==
- Night of 100 Stars, a live television benefit for the Actors Fund of America, was presented on NBC. One of the 100 people featured, American actor and acting coach Lee Strasberg, died three days after the broadcast.
- Bobby Allison won NASCAR's Daytona 500 stock car race, becoming the third driver (after Cale Yarborough and then 7-time winner Richard Petty) to win the race more than once. Allison's car ran out of gas after he crossed the finish line, reaching empty as he was driving to victory lane to collect the $120,000 check for the winner.
- The radio show Rock, Roll & Remember, which would run for 22 years and would be hosted by Dick Clark, broadcast its first episode as a documentary and "oldies" music program. Though the show would be named for Clark in 1983, it was initially hosted by Gene Weed.
- Born: Marian Gaborik, Slovak ice hockey player and 2012 NHL All-Star Game MVP, member of the Slovakia national men's team; in Trenčín, Czechoslovakia

== February 15, 1982 (Monday) ==
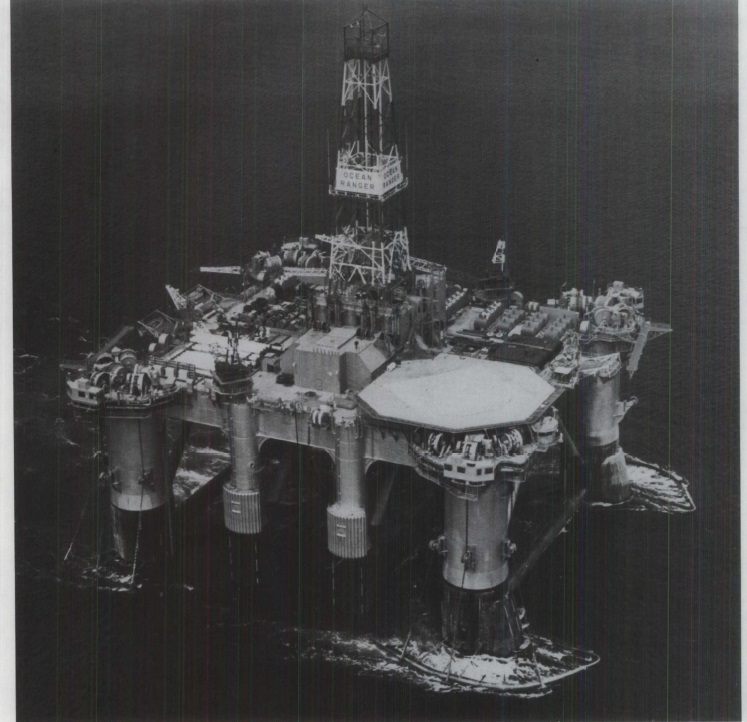
The Ocean Ranger platform prior to its destruction

- All 84 rig workers aboard Mobil Oil of Canada's oil platform Ocean Ranger were killed when the structure fell and sank during a storm off the coast of Newfoundland. Ocean Ranger sent a mayday call at 12:52 am local time, noting a severe list of more than 10 degrees and getting worse. Thirty-eight minutes later, the work crew began going to lifeboat stations and Ocean Ranger sent its last communication. While at least 56 people evacuated and one lifeboat was launched, the boat capsized during an attempt to tether it to a rescue boat, M/V Seaforth Highlander. The platform sank at 3:13 in the morning, and there were no survivors. The dead were 46 Mobil employees and 28 contractors from other companies.
- The army of Ethiopia, directed by the nation's leader, Mengistu Haile Mariam, began the Red Star Campaign, a five month operation to eliminate the Eritrean independence movement and the two separatist armies, the EPLF and the TPLF. With more than 84,000 troops, the Ethiopian attackers outnumbered the 22,000 Eritrean guerrillas and started a simultaneous attack on three fronts, but would ultimately be forced to abandon the operation on July 5, 1982.
- Sri Lanka's national television network, Rupavahini, began broadcasting
- Agatha Barbara took office for a five-year term as the third President of Malta, and the first woman to hold the office.
- The Jatiyo Sangsad Bhaban, designed by American architect Louis Kahn to serve as the parliamentary building for Bangladesh, was used for the first time at Dacca, with a session of the Asian nation's unicameral parliament, the Jatiya Sangsad.
- The opposition political party Union pour la Démocratie et le Progrès Social (UDPS) was founded by Étienne Tshisekedi and other politicians in the Republic of Zaire (now the Democratic Republic of the Congo). At the time, Zaire had only one legal party, the Mouvement Populaire de la Révolution (MPR), led by dictator Mobutu Sese Seko, and Mobutu responded in March by putting Tshisekedi and 12 other UDPS members on charges of treason.
- Four opponents of South Africa's racist policy of apartheid were assassinated by a bomb planted by the Vlakplaas, the death squad of South Africa's Security Branch. Eustice Madikela, Peter Matabane, Fanyana Nhlapo were members of COSAS, the outlawed Congress of South African Students and were killed instantly. A fourth student, Zandissle Musi, survived with serious injuries and would die from the wounds in 2021.
- Born:' Tariq Khan, Bollywood producer of India's Hindi language films, known for co-producing Am I Next and Country of Blind in 2023; in Poonch, Jammu and Kashmir territory
- Died:
  - Kurt Enoch, 86, German-born American publisher who co-founded Albatross Books in Germany in 1932, and Penguin Books in Britain in 1935
  - Noah Dietrich, 92, American businessman who was CEO of various businesses owned by Howard Hughes, including Hughes Aircraft, Trans World Airlines (TWA), and RKO Pictures between 1925 and 1957.
  - Ralph Teetor, 91, American inventor who created cruise control for motor vehicles in 1948

== February 16, 1982 (Tuesday) ==
- The sinking of the Soviet freighter Mekhanik Tarasov killed 28 of the 35 persons known to have been aboard, after the ship's captain refused to allow his men to be taken aboard a Danish fishing vessel declaring that a Soviet rescue vessel was on the way. The Soviet ship, Ivan Dvorsky, did not arrive until more than three hours after Mekhanik Tarasov went down in the Atlantic Ocean off of the coast of Newfoundland. The Danish trawler rescued nine of the Soviet crew who had escaped into the sea.
- The American computer manufacturer Compaq was incorporated in Texas as Gateway Technology by three former senior managers of Texas Instruments, Rod Canion, Jim Harris, and Bill Murto, who chose a name developed from the words "compatability" and "quality". Eleven months later, the company would introduce the 28 pounds (13 kg)} Compaq Portable, designed to run IBM personal computer programs. Compaq would exist for 20 years before being acquired by Hewlett-Packard.
- Magdalena Kopp, the wife and accomplice of the Venezuelan-born terrorist "Carlos the Jackal" (Ilich Ramirez Sanchez), was arrested in Paris along with Bruno Bréguet, after police noticed that her automobile had been parked incorrectly. Inside the car, five kilograms (11 pounds) of the explosive material pentaerythritol tetranitrate were located, along with false passports and sketches of various locations. She would be imprisoned for three years before being deported to West Germany, and reunite with Carlos a month later.
- The Guatemalan Army carried out the massacre of at least 18 people of the Mayan minority, including 11 children and a pregnant woman, in an attack on the on the village of Xix in Chajul province.
- Born: Lupe Fiasco (stage name for Wasalu Muhammad Jaco), American rap artist; in Chicago
- Died: Nathan Witt, 79, American lawyer who served as the secretary of the U.S. National Labor Relations Board before being forced to resign in 1940 on accusations that he was a Communist
- Died: Luis Pacheco de Céspedes, 86, Peruvian composer and violinist

== February 17, 1982 (Wednesday) ==
- In Zimbabwe, Prime Minister Robert Mugabe dropped his main political rival, Home Affairs Minister Joshua Nkomo, from his cabinet after accusing Nkomo of plotting to overthrow the government of the southern African nation, ending the unity of the Patriotic Union that had governed the former colony of Rhodesia since 1980.
- An escalator accident killed 15 people at the Aviamotoryama station of the Moscow Metro. The only official confirmation of the accident by the government-controlled Soviet media was aa statement in Moscow's evening newspaper Vechernyaya Moskva that "casualties resulted" when the escalator broke.
- The Sri Lanka national cricket team, which had been admitted on July 21, 1981 as the eighth full member of the International Cricket Council (ICC) played its first Test cricket match, facing the visiting England national team at the Paikiasothy Saravanamuttu Stadium in Colombo, finishing on February 21 with England winning by 7 wickets.
- Born: Adriano Leite Ribeiro, Brazilian footballer known as Adriano, with 48 caps for the Brazil national team; in Rio de Janeiro

== February 18, 1982 (Thursday) ==
- Elections for the Dail Eirann were held in the Republic of Ireland. The ruling Fianna Fáil slightly increased its lead from 78 to 81 seats, in the 166-seat parliament and the Fine Gael and Labour Party coalition, led by Prime Minister Garret FitzGerald, lost its s control of 80 seats fell to 78, as Fine Gail dropped to 63 seats and Labour held its 15 seats.
- The South African Navy frigate SAS President Kruger sank after being struck by another ship, SAS Tafelberg, with the loss of 16 crew. The impact tore a large hole in the President Kruger and killed 13 of its 193 crew immediately, while three more the crew were unable to evacuated before the sinking.
- Deng Xiaoping, the Vice-Premier of China and the nation's de facto ruler, was seen in public for the first time in five weeks as he appeared at a meeting in Beijing with Foreign Minister Huang Hua in greeting the exiled Cambodian Prince Norodom Sihanouk.
- The government of Iran announced that the Ayatollah Ruhollah Khomeini, ailing supreme leader of the Islamic Republic, would eventually be replaced by a council of three men.
- Voters in a by-election in Canada's province of Alberta elected Gordon Keller, the candidate of the Western Canada Concept, which proposed the secession of Alberta, British Columbia, Manitoba and Saskatchewan.
- Born:
  - Courtney Act (stage name for Shane Jenek) Australian drag queen, television personality and popular singer; in Brisbane
  - Victoria Tereshchuk, Ukrainian pentathlete and gold medalist in the 2011 women's world championship; in Luhansk, Ukrainian SSR, Soviet UnionGjerde, Arild; Jeroen Heijmans; Bill Mallon; Hilary Evans (2016). "Viktoriya Tereshchuk Bio, Stats, and Results". Olympics. Sports Reference.com. Archived from the original on 2020-04-18.
- Died:
  - Tony Mirra, American mobster and lieutenant for the Bonanno crime family, was killed in execution style at a parking garage serving the Independed Plaza apartment building. The killing was carried out by three Bonanno gang enforcers, as retaliation for inadvertently introducing FBI informant Joseph D. Pistone to the gang. Mirra's uncle, Alfred Embarrato and two of his cousins Richard Cantarella and Joseph D'Amico, shot Mirra at close range while riding with him in a car.
  - J. M. Robson (born John Michael Rabinovich), 81, Belgian-born British geneticist and co-discoverer of the effects of mustard gas mutagenesis
  - Sol Babitz, 70, American violinist and musicologist who was a pioneer in historically informed performance, the researching and recreation of defunct music practices
  - Pat Henry (stage name for Patrick Henry Scarnato), 57, American comedian known for being the warm-up act for the concerts of singer Frank Sinatra, died from a heart attack hours after his last appearance with Sinatra at the Caesars Palace hotel in Las Vegas.

== February 19, 1982 (Friday) ==
- The Boeing 757 jet made its first flight.
- The DeLorean Motor Company went into receivership as part of bankruptcy proceedings in Northern Ireland after the British government and American businesses declined to provide additional aid.
- At the Tsuklakhang Palace in Gangtok, capital of the Indian state of Sikkim, Tobgyal Wangchuk Tenzing was crowned in an elaborate ceremony as the new "king" namgyal of Sikkim. Although the monarchy had been abolished in the Himalayan kingdom in 1975 as Sikkim was made India's 22nd state, B. B. Gurung, the Chief Minister of Sikkim, endorsed Wangchuk as the heir to the Namgyal dynasty. The Wangchuck Namgyal then left Gangtok to join a Hindu monastery and became a "spiritual recluse".
- The successful Tamil language film Moondram Pirai (The third crescent), a romantic drama, starring Kamal Hassan and Sridevi Kapoor, premiered in cinemas in India and would become one of the most popular films of the year.
- Born: Camelia Potec, Romanian swimmer and 2004 Olympic gold medalist in the 200m women's freestyle; in Braila

== February 20, 1982 (Saturday) ==
- Tanguturi Anjaiah, tendered his resignation as Chief Minister of the Indian state of Andhra Pradesh after being asked to step down by Prime Minister Indira Gandhi following an argument with her son Rajiv Gandhi.
- The first stereoscopic video game, SubRoc-3D, was introduced at a press conference in Japan by Sega Enterprises. Simulating the firing of torpedoes from a submarine, the shooter game featured a periscope-shaped viewer that offered a different image for each eye and released to arcades in Japan and North America in the summer.
- Born:
  - Osita Iheme, Nigerian comedian and film actor known being part of a duo with comedian Chinedu Ikedieze
  - Tisha (Nusrat Imrose Tisha), Bangladeshi film and TV actress; in Rajshahi
- Died:
  - Dr. Edward C. Franklin, 53, American immunologist known for the discovery of heavy chain disease and for his research in the discovery of amyloids. One variety of gamma heavy chain disease, "Franklin's disease", is named for him.
  - Isobel Wylie Hutchison, 92, Scottish explorer and writer
  - Frances Grant (stage name for Stella Fortier McCarron), 68, American film actress known for Oh, Susanna! (1936) and Red River Valley (1936), both with Gene Autry.
  - Rene Dubos, 81, French-born American microbiologist and 1969 Pulitzer Prize winner for the book So Human an Animal, died on his 81st birthday.

== February 21, 1982 (Sunday) ==
- The musical revue Ain't Misbehavin', a tribute to the music of Fats Waller, closed on Broadway after 1,604 performances dating to the premiere on May 9, 1978.
- Free-lance journalist Christopher Jones, whose story "In the land of the Khmer Rouge" had been published in the December 20, 1981 issue of The New York Times Magazine, admitted that he had made the story up and that he plagiarized part of the story from a novel, The Royal Way, by Andre Malraux.
- Died: Murray Kaufman, 60, American disc jockey and promoter known professionally as "Murray the K", died from cancer.

== February 22, 1982 (Monday) ==
- The governments of Belgium and Denmark devalued their currencies in relation to the other eight member nations of the European Monetary System, with the value of the Belgian franc reduced by 8.5 percent and the Danish krona by 3 percent. Belgium's decision was made unilaterally despite the Belgium–Luxembourg Economic Union that required a joint decision with Luxembourg.

== February 23, 1982 (Tuesday) ==
- In a referendum in Greenland, voters decided, by a margin of 12,615 to 11,180 to withdraw from the European Communities (EC). Denmark, which administers a protectorate over Greenland, had been a member of the EC since 1973.
- Guerrillas of the Uganda Freedom Movement, seeking to overhrown Uganda's President Milton Obote, attacked the Ugandan Army barracks in Malire, part of the capital, Kampala, with mortar shells and rockets for eight hours, killing and wounding as many as 300 civilians and soldiers but sustained a large number of casualties from the counterattack by Obote's militia, the Uganda National Liberation Army.
- A group of 12 masked guerrillas of the Irish Republican Army, armed with automatic weapons and explosives boarded a British freighter, the St. Bedan, as it sailed into Lough Foyle to deliver 1,800 tons of British coal from Northumberland to Derry in Northern Ireland. The 10-member crew was forced onto a life raft and set adrift, and the raiders escaped in a waiting boat before timed explosives sank the freighter.
- Born:
  - Kateryna Mikhalitsyna, Ukrainian children's writer; in Mlyniv, Ukrainian SSR, Soviet Union
  - Karan Singh Grover, Indian TV and film actor known for the Hindi language shows Dill Mill Gayye (2007-2010) and Kitni Mast Hai Zindagi (2004-2005) and the 2015 film Alone; in New Delhi
  - Anna Chapman, Russian model and spy for the Russian Federation's SVR intelligence agency; as Anna Kushchenko in Volgograd
  - Nick Dupree, American disability rights activist; in Morgantown, West Virginia (d.2017)

== February 24, 1982 (Wednesday) ==

- The American technology company Sun Microsystems was founded by Stanford University graduate students Scott McNealy, Andy Bechtolsheim, and Vinod Khosla. They were followed by a fourth grad student, Bill Joy. Their company would be sold in 2009 for 5.6 billion U.S. dollars.
- Wayne Gretzky of the Edmonton Oilers broke Phil Esposito's National Hockey League record of 76 for most goals in a season (set in 1971), scoring his 77th, 78th and 79th goals in a 6 to 3 defeat of the Buffalo Sabres in the 64th game of the season. Gretzky would finish the 1981-82 regular season with 92 goals in 80 games.
- In South Africa, a vote of no confidence in the government of Prime Minister P. W. Botha was held after he supported a plan to allow nonwhites to have a role in the white-minority government. A faction (led by Andries Treurnicht) of 22 members of parliament from Botha's own National Party joined the motion by the opposition.
- Twelve Lebanese gunmen, led by Hamza akl Hamieh, hijacked Kuwait Airways Flight 561 with 105 people aboard, after it took off from Beirut. The hijackers surrendered the next morning.
- Born:
  - Jessica Regan, Irish TV actress; in Kilkenny
  - Fala Chen, Chinese born American actress and singer; in Chengdu, Sichuan province
  - "Amandine", the first "test-tube baby" (conceived by in vitro fertilization) in France. She was born at the Hôpital Antoine-Béclère in the Paris suburb of Clamart, after her conception was enabled by the work of a team of physicians led by Jacques Testart, René Frydman, and Émile Papiernik.
- Died: Virginia Bruce (stage name for Helen Virginia Briggs), 71, American film actress and singer, known for starring in Jane Eyre (1934), Love, Honor and Goodbye (1945), and Reluctant Bride (1955)

== February 25, 1982 (Thursday) ==
- The European Court of Human Rights ruled that teachers who caned, belted or tawsed misbehaving children, against the wishes of the child's parents, were in breach of the Human Rights Convention.
- In Chile, trade union leader Tucapel Jiménez, a 60-year-old taxi driver and the director of the Agrupación Nacional de Empleados Fiscales (ANEF, the National Group of Public Employees), was kidnapped and murdered by members of the Chilean Army's DINA police force near Santiago. An investigation after the fall of the regime of Augusto Pinochet determined that Jimenez had been killed by individuals who were posing as passengers seeking a ride to the Santiago suburb of Renca, and was shot five times.
- The Landsat 2 satellite, which had been expected to last for only one year after its launch on January 22, 1975, ceased functioning after more than seven years of transmitting images of Earth to NASA.
- Born:
  - Flavia Pennetta, Italian tennis player and winner of the 2015 U.S. Open singles and the 2011 Australian open doubles; in Brindisi
  - Chris Baird, Northern Ireland footballer with 79 caps for the Northern Ireland team; in Ballymena, County Antrim
  - Arun Matheswaran, Indian Tamil language film director
- Died: Mukhtar Begum, 80, Indian and Pakistani singer and actress known as the "Melody Queen of India" for her singing roles in multiple films in the 1930s

== February 26, 1982 (Friday) ==
- An Air Tanzania Boeing 737 airliner was hijacked during a domestic flight in Tanzania with 94 passengers and crew was hijacked and diverted to Kenya, Saudi Arabia and Greece before landing at the Stansted international airport that serves freight traffic near London. The hijackers released eight foreign passengers before flying to the UK with the Tanzanian citizens. British commandos from the Special Air Service (SAS) surrounded the aircraft and the hijackers released a pregnant woman and a child, but held the remaining hostages. On Sunday, the hijackers released their 82 remaining hostages at the request of Oscar Kambona, former Foreign Minister of Tanzania who had been living in exile in England.
- Turkish security police arrested 14 dissident members of the Turkish Peace Association on charges of communist propaganda and sedition, including Mahmut Dikerdem and Reha İsvan. Sentenced to terms of eight years imprisonment, the group members were held for four years at the Maltepe military prison.
- The popular Indian Tamil language film Payanangal Mudivathillai (Journeys Never End) was released. The romantic drama, the first to be written and directed by R. Sundarrajan, starred Mohan and actress Poornima Bhagyaraj and was shown in theaters for more than a year.
- Born:
  - Brian Shaw, American strongman, winner of the World's Strongest Man in 2011, 2013, 2015 and 2016, known for breaking a record for heaviest deadlift weight (975.5 pounds (442.5 kg)) in 2013; in Fort Lupton, Colorado
  - Li Na, Chinese tennis player known for winning the women's singles title at the French Open (2011) and the Australian Open (2014); in Wuhan, Hubei province
- Died:
  - Teinosuke Kinugasa, 86, Japanese actor and filmmaker, known for A Page of Madness (1926) and Gate of Hell (1954)

== February 27, 1982 (Saturday) ==
- Elections were held for the 47 seats of the Fono Samoa the unicameral parliament of Western Samoa. While 25 independent candidates won a majority of the seats, the new Human Rights Protection Party won the other 22 seats and its leader, Tofilau Eti Alesana, would form a government as Prime Minister later in the year.
- The D'Oyly Carte Opera Company, which had existed for more than 100 years since its founding in the 1875, gave its final performance before going out of business, with a farewell show at the Adelphi Theatre on London's West End. The company would be revived in 1988 following a bequest in the will of the founder's widow, Dame Bridget D’Oyly Carte.
- A jury in Atlanta found Wayne Williams guilty of the murder of two young black people among the 28 missing or killed in the Atlanta Child Murders. Williams was sentenced to two consecutive terms of life imprisonment.
- Retired Salvadoran Army Major Robert D'Abuisson, leader of the National Republican Alliance, an extreme right-wing political party in El Salvador, was shot and seriously wounded as he was driving past the Ilopango Airport that served San Salvador. D'Abuisson was campaigning for the March 28 legislative elections when he was ambushed.
- Born: Bruno Soares, Brazilian tennis player, winner of the 2012 and 2014 U.S. Open mixed doubles, and the 2012 and 2016 men's doubles; and the 2016 Australian Open men's doubles and mixed doubles; in Belo Horizonte

== February 28, 1982 (Sunday) ==
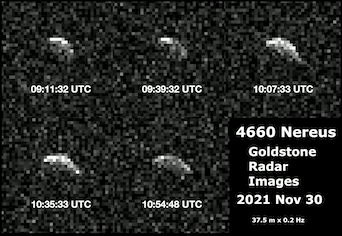
Nereus in 2021

- The asteroid 4660 Nereus, notable for an orbit that brings it close to Earth and, as such, ideal for exploration by Earth's spacecraft, was discovered by astronomer Eleanor F. Helin from the Palomar Observatory. The discovery came after Nereus had come within 2.6 million miles (4.1 million km) of Earth. Nereus would approach within 2,444,625 miles (3,934,242 km) of Earth on December 11, 2021 and will pass within 744,407 miles (1,198,007 km) on February 14, 2060.
- The Organisation of African Unity (OAU), led by Secretary-General Edem Kodjo, granted membership to the Sahrawi Arab Democratic Republic, which was fighting for independence of the Western Sahara, a colony of Spain until its annexation by Morocco.
- Parliamentary elections were held in North Korea for the 615 members of the Supreme People's Assembly, with voters limited to voting yes or no for the candidates of the nation's only political party, the Democratic Front for the Reunification of Korea, commonly called the Fatherland Front. Kim Jong Il, the son of the North Korea's Supreme Leader Kim Il Sung (and his eventual successor), was on the ballot for the first time.
- Born:
  - Natalia Vodianova, Russian fashion model and millionaire; in Gorky, Russian SFSR, Soviet Union (now Nizhny Novgorod, Russian Federation)
  - Verena Bentele, blind German cross-country skier and 2006 Winter Paralympics gold medalist; in Lindau, West Germany
  - Marian Gaborik, Slovak ice hockey player in the National Hockey League and for the Slovakia national team; in Trenčín, Czechoslovakia
