= Efraín Villanueva =

Colombian author

Efraín Villanueva (Barranquilla February 11, 1982) is a Colombian author. He has published the books Tomacorrientes Inalámbricos, Guía para buscar lo que no has perdido and Adentro, todo. Afuera… nada. His fiction has also been included in several anthologies such as El territorio ausente, Diario de la pandemia, Cuentos cortos para esperas largas, among others.

As a cultural journalist, Villanuevas has contributed, in Spanish and English, with media outlets such as Granta en español, El Heraldo, Literal Magazine, Arcadia, among others.

Villanueva holds an MFA degree in Creative Writing in Spanish from the University of Iowa and a post-graduate degree in Narrative Creation from Universidad Central in Bogotá. He currently lives in Germany.

== Biography ==
=== Barranquilla and Bogotá ===
Efraín Villanueva was born on February 11, 1982, in Barranquilla, Colombia, to Efraín Villanueva and Beatriz Angulo. He became a fiction reader at an early age and since then cultivated the idea of becoming a writer. In 1998, his last year of high school at Colegio San José, he considered studying journalism and dedicating himself to the craft of writing. However, he studied Systems Engineering at Pontifical Xavierian University, in Bogotá, where he graduated in 2005. He complemented his studies in 2007 with a postgraduate degree in Systems Project Management at Del Rosario University. For almost ten years he practiced his profession in different positions and projects in various industries.

In 2011, Villanueva switched from Systems Engineering to writing. That same year, he co-founded Tertulia Alternativa, a digital portal in which he wrote opinion, current events and technology articles until the site was shut down in 2014. During that same period, he gained a position as blogger in El Heraldo in Barranquilla, the most prestigious and renowned newspaper of Colombia's North coast.

In 2012, he was accepted into the Narrative Creation's postgraduate at the Central University of Bogotá, where he took classes with writers such as Óscar Godoy, Isaías Peña Gutiérrez and Julio Paredes. Luz y oscuridad, his creative thesis project, was a collection of short stories supervised by Colombian writer Roberto Burgos Cantor. Among his most notable classmates is Constanza Martínez, a literary scholar and winner, in 2010, of the El Barco de Vapor Prize for Children and Young People's Literature. In 2013, he finished his graduate degree and definitively abandoned his career in Information Technology.

=== Iowa ===
From 2014 to 2016, Villanueva was enrolled in the MFA in Creative Writing in Spanish at the University of Iowa, where he received an assignment to teach Spanish to undergraduate students. At the university, he attended fiction, poetry and nonfiction workshops, but also took classes in the MFA in Literary Translation and the Writer’s Workshop.

Together with his classmates, he devised and organized Subtitulados. The project was a bimonthly reading series to promote and present the students’ work in a largely English-speaking city. Among his most notable classmates are Mexican Author Andrea Chapela and Barranquilla author Giuseppe Caputo.

While in Iowa, Villanueva won his first contest: El Tiempo del Minicuento, sponsored by the Colombian newspaper El Tiempo. He was also a contributor of Iowa Literaria, the digital magazine of the Master's program, where he published book reviews and interviews. It was on this magazine where he debuted in non-fiction with the text Crucigramas, a remembrance of his childhood that he dedicated to his father. In 2016, he published Chucky, his first fiction text, in the anthology Tenemos Miedo by Matera magazine in Colombia.

His creative thesis project was Crucigramas, a collection of personal non-fiction texts, supervised by Honduran writer Horacio Castellanos Moya.

=== Dortmund ===
In Iowa City Villanueva met his future wife. After finishing his studies in 2016, the couple decided to relocate to Germany, her home country.

From September 2016 to August 2017, he participated in the International Exchange Program, organized by Professor Walter Grünzweig, at the Technical University of Dortmund. His studies focused on American literature.

== Literary career ==
=== Books ===
Villanueva has written most of his literary work in Germany, but his focus has been on the Colombian and Latin-American markets. He has worked on creation and edition of textual content projects and translation, but he has mainly dedicated himself to cultural journalism. He has been a freelance contributor to various printed and online media, including Granta en español (Spain), the cultural magazines of El Heraldo (Colombia) and Literal Magazine (United States).

==== Tomacorrientes inalámbricos ====
This 2018's award-winning novel is clearly influenced by the first year of Villanueva's life in Germany. The book narrates the experiences of Alirio, a Caribbean man recently arrived in Europe, his impressions of the Old World and his encounter with Sabeth, a German photographer who is dealing with an existential crisis.

Tomacorrientes inalámbricos (Wireless Sockets) was awarded, in 2017, the Portafolio de Estímulos’ Prize for Novel, an artistic support program of the Secretary of Culture of Barranquilla. The book was published by Collage Editores and debuted at the 2018 International Book Fair of Bogotá. That same year, the novel was presented at La Cueva, in Barranquilla, in a conversation between the author and journalist and writer Joaquín Mattos.

In a kind of public letter to the author, columnist Tulio Ramos Mancilla suggested that "the great merit of the book, Efraín, is to conceal the existence of its backbone, of its skeleton, of its rigidity, and yet to beat internal coherence, to give birth to order out of chaos, perhaps to represent - and this is my opinion - the way we from this small part of the planet [the Colombian Caribbean] deal with reality".

==== Guía para buscar lo que no has perdido ====
This book, awarded with the XIV National Short Story Book Contest of the Universidad Industrial de Santander and published by the university's publishing house in 2019, consists of 8 stories or daily-life characters facing daily-life situations. The collection was presented in March 2019 in a conversation between the author and literature professor and writer Óscar Humberto Mejía Blanco in Bucaramanga.

The award-winning Colombian writer Andrés Mauricio Muñoz said that in Guía para buscar lo que no has perdido (A Guide to Finding What You Haven’t Lost): "Villanueva exhibits in this book of short stories his greatest skills, the craft of a decanted, meticulous, convinced storyteller, who does not give in to the characters that stalk him until he turns them into prose, certain that therein lies the only decorum that will redeem them from oblivion. The UIS Prize once again discovers a voice that will undoubtedly become a reference in our literature".

==== Adentro, todo. Afuera...nada ====
In 2020, when German citizens started hoarding toilet paper during the COVID-19 quarantine, Villanueva wrote a diatribe on social media that became a daily routine. This spontaneous exercise turned into a personal and detailed diary about the pandemic, in which Villanueva captures the Zeitgeist of what was happening in Germany, while at the same time keeping an eye on the events in his native Colombia. This book contains reflections, thoughts, poems and annotations that give an idea of how life changed because of the virus.

The diary Adentro, todo. Afuera...nada (Inside, All. Outside...Nothing) was published in 2022 by Editorial Mackandal, an indie publishing house from the Colombian Caribbean. The book was presented at La Cueva in Barranquilla in a conversation between the author and the journalist Ivonne Arroyo. With Afuera, nada. Adentro…todo Villanueva had his first reading in Germany: the book was presented at the Literaturhaus in Dortmund, in collaboration with the Technical University of Dortmund and the support of Professor Walter Grünzweig.

=== Anthologies ===
==== Tenemos miedo ====
Tenemos miedo (We Are Afraid) was a 2016 initiative by Matera Magazine, directed by Manuel Kalmanovitz. Villanueva contributed with the shorty story titled Chucky, who he also read during his graduation reading in Iowa City.

==== El Coi y otros cuentos ====
El Coi y otros cuentos (El Coi and Other Stories) is a 2017 compilation that includes the winning and finalist stories of the National Short Story Contest of the La Cueva Foundation, directed by Heriberto Fiorillo. Villanueva was a finalist with his short story Cinco cuadras a la redonda.

==== Cuentos cortos para esperas largas ====
Cuentos cortos para esperas largas (Short Stories for Long Waits) is a 2019 collection that includes the winning and finalist stories of the Short Stories for Long Waits Contest organized by the Pereira's Literature Festival and Casa Creative publishing house. Villanueva was the winner with his short story Nada de nada.

==== Especial Cuento Caribe II ====
Especial Cuento Caribe II (Caribbean Short Story Special II) is a 2019 compilation. It was an initiative of the Revista Víacuarenta of the Biblioteca Piloto del Caribe, directed and edited by Miguel Iriarte. It gathers voices of storytellers from the Colombian Caribbean, including Villanueva's short story titled Puerto Chimo.

==== Diario de la pandemia ====
In 2020, the Revista de la Universidad de Mexico, directed and edited by Guadalupe Nettel, compiled international testimonies from “some of the best writers of our time” about the COVID-19 pandemic. Villanueva participated in the anthology with his text Día 1455, which would later become part of diary Adentro, todo. Afuera… nada.

==== El territorio ausente ====
Aluvión, “a literary criticism project” had a special issue to collect “migrant voices from the Caribbean” with an approach focused “more on the figure of the author and less on the genre”. In 2022, Villanueva was invited for an interview with Farides Lugo, director and editor of the initiative. The anthology also includes excerpts from Tomacorrientes inalámbricos and Adentro, todo. Afuera… nada.

== Works ==
=== Novels ===
- Tomacorrientes inalámbricos (2018)

=== Short story collections ===
- Guía para buscar lo que no has perdido (2019)

=== Non-fiction ===
- Adentro, todo. Afuera...nada (2022)

=== Anthologies ===
- Tenemos miedo. Short Story: Chucky (2016)
- El Coi y otros cuentos. Short Story: Cinco cuadras a la redonda (2018)
- Cuentos cortos para esperas largas. Short Story: Nada de nada (2019)
- Especial Cuento Caribe II. Short Story: Puerto Chimo (2019)
- Diario de la pandemia. Text: Día 1455 (2020)
- El territorio ausente. Text: various (2022)

== Cultural journalism ==
=== Book reviews ===
- Quiero ser artista (USA, 2015), in Iowa Literaria
- Racimo (USA, 2015), in Iowa Literaria
- Lecturas para la Copa América, (Colombia, 2016), in Revista Arcadia
- La hora de la estrella (Colombia, 2017), in Latitud magazine of El Heraldo
- Queridos antifeministas (Colombia, 2017), in Latitud magazine of El Heraldo
- Un hombre puede ser destruido, pero no derrotado (USA, 2017), in Literal Magazine
- Macondo visto desde afuera (Colombia, 2017), in Latitud magazine of El Heraldo
- Esto es agua (USA, 2017), in Literal Magazine
- Relato de la inmigración (Colombia, 2017), in Latitud magazine of El Heraldo
- Flores rotas (Colombia, 2017), in Latitud magazine of El Heraldo
- 'Tenía que probarlas’: Bukowski y sus mujeres ficcionalizadas (Colombia, 2018), in El Dominical magazine of El Heraldo
- Desayuno en Tifanny’s (Colombia, 2018), in El Dominical magazine of El Heraldo
- Un rayo de luz luminoso (Hiroshima by John Hesey) (Colombia, 2018), in El Dominical magazine of El Heraldo
- Desde esta cámara oscura (USA, 2018), in Literal Magazine
- Armas de destrucción matemática (USA, 2018), in Literal Magazine
- Leyendo a Lolita en Teherán (Colombia, 2019), in El Dominical magazine of El Heraldo
- Toda cultura es ficción (USA, 2019), in Literal Magazine

=== Essays, opinion columns, current events texts, and other articles ===
- Baloto de paz (Colombia, 2016), in Pacifista!
- La tierra es plana (Colombia, 2016), in Pacifista!
- Destripando historias (USA, 2017), in Literal Magazine
- De mudanzas, estantes y libros (Colombia, 2017), in Latitud magazine of El Heraldo
- Eligiendo al nuevo líder del mundo libre (USA, 2017), in Literal Magazine
- Fábricas de palabras (USA, 2017), in Literal Magazine
- Aprendiendo cómo (no) escribir (USA, 2017), in Literal Magazine
- The Dangers of 'Us' versus 'Them' (USA, 2017), in Little Village Magazine
- Tsondoku (Colombia, 2017), in Latitud magazine of El Heraldo
- Álbumes de fotos de subrayados (Colombia, 2018), in El Dominical magazine of El Heraldo
- Cuando los refugiados eran alemanes (USA, 2018), in Literal Magazine
- De confusiones y extrañamientos (Colombia, 2018), in Genio Tropical
- Piedras en el camino (USA, 2018), in Literal Magazine
- AI Helped Me Write This Article (USA, 2022), in Literal Magazine
- Borrando palabras hasta encontrar poesía (USA, 2022), in Literal Magazine

=== Profiles ===
- Sin lugar a dudas demente (Elizabeth Cochran) (Colombia, 2017), in Latitud magazine of El Heraldo
- Los libros son armas en la guerra de ideas (William Faulkner) (Colombia, 2017), in Latitud magazine of El Heraldo
- El modernista (Álvaro Cepeda Samudio) (Colombia, 2017), in Latitud magazine of El Heraldo
- El genio de la pañoleta (David Foster Wallace) (Colombia, 2017), in Latitud magazine of El Heraldo
- Adiós al teórico de la modernidad líquida (Zygmunt Bauman), (Colombia, 2017), in Latitud magazine of El Heraldo
- Regresando a casa (Zelda Fitzgerald) (USA, 2018), in Literal Magazine
- A veces me pregunto cuál es mi verdadero nombre (Doris Lessing) (Colombia, 2018), in El Dominical magazine of El Heraldo
- El ‘descubridor’ que no supo lo que ‘descubrió’ (Cristóbal Colón) (Colombia, 2018), in El Dominical magazine of El Heraldo
- En un bosque lejano y espeso (Los hermanos Grimm) (Colombia, 2018), in El Dominical magazine of El Heraldo
- El fin de una hermosa amistad (Vladimir Nabokov) (Colombia, 2018), in El Dominical magazine of El Heraldo
- El padre de la bomba atómica (J. Robert Oppenheimer) (USA, 2018), in Literal Magazine
- Debajo del iceberg (Ernest Hemingway) (Colombia, 2018), in El Dominical magazine of El Heraldo
- Propaganda de guerra (George Orwell) (USA, 2018), in Literal Magazine
- La voz de los ojos azules (Frank Sinatra) (Colombia, 2018), in El Dominical magazine of El Heraldo
- Tengo un sueño (Martin Luther King) (Colombia, 2018), in El Dominical magazine of El Heraldo
- Hitler, sexo y mujeres (Adolf Hitler) (Colombia, 2018), in El Dominical magazine of El Heraldo
- De objeto a sujeto (Elisa Mújica) (Colombia, 2018), in Latitud magazine of El Heraldo
- La excepcionalidad de Susan Sontag (USA, 2019), in Literal Magazine
- Las cápsulas de tiempo de Andy Warhol (USA, 2019), in Literal Magazine
- ¡Sonríe, Jamaica! (Bob Marley) (Colombia, 2019), in La cháchara
- El Artículo Ludwig (Edgar Allan Poe) (Colombia, 2019), in El Dominical magazine of El Heraldo
- El minimalista no era Carver (Raymond Carver) (USA, 2019), in Literal Magazine
- Bolívar en Europa (Simón Bolívar) (Colombia, 2019), in El Dominical magazine of El Heraldo
- El molde de Jane Austen (Colombia, 2019), in El Dominical magazine of El Heraldo
- El genio distraído que todo lo aplazaba (Leonardo da Vinci) (USA, 2019), in Literal Magazine
- Cien años de la Bauhaus (USA, 2019), in Literal Magazine
- El día en que Gabito conoció a su madre (Gabriel García Márquez) (Colombia, 2019), in El Dominical magazine of El Heraldo
- Adiós a Simone de Beauvoir (Colombia, 2019), in Las Artes
- La fotografía de Lewis Carroll (USA, 2019), in Literal Magazine
- Gertrude Stein: celebridad y genio (Colombia, 2019), in El Dominical magazine of El Heraldo
- Las lecturas de George Orwell (Colombia, 2019), in El Dominical magazine of El Heraldo
- El envejecimiento de Simone de Beauvoir (Colombia, 2019), in El Dominical magazine of El Heraldo
- Sembradíos de maíz (Flannery O’Connor) (USA, 2020), in Literal Magazine
- Del legado de Goethe, o cuando el mundo existe más allá de las narices (USA, 2022), in Literal Magazine

=== Chronicles ===
- Donar por dinero (Spain, 2016), Granta en español
- Dolor de patria (Colombia, 2016), in Vice Colombia
- Dolor de patria (Colombia, 2016), in Pacifista!
- Costeñitas en Colombia (USA, 2017), in Roads and Kingdoms
- De azafatas y nazis (USA, 2017), in Literal Magazine
- Fish broth in Barranquilla (USA, 2017), in Roads and Kingdoms
- Refajo in La Calera (USA, 2017), in Roads and Kingdoms
- Das verlorene Paradies (USA, 2017), in Literal Magazine
- Tamal in Bogota (USA, 2017), in Roads and Kingdoms
- 17 Things to Know Before You Go to Barranquilla (USA, 2017), in Roads and Kingdoms
- Einfach ein Typ, der in ein anderes Land gezogen ist, weil er sich verliebt hat, (Germany, 2018), in Huffington Post Deutschland
- Día de confinamiento 1455 (Mexico, 2020), in Revista de la Universidad de México
- Día de confinamiento 1445 (Colombia, 2020), in La Cháchara
- Día de confinamiento 1438 (Mexico, 2020), in Revés
- Día de confinamiento 1442 (Colombia, 2020), in La Revista Actual
- Día de confinamiento 1440 (USA, 2020), in Literal Magazine
- Un día de trabajo (USA, 2020), in Literal Magazine

=== Interviews ===
- ‘Ser escritor implica un descolocamiento perpetuo’ (USA, 2015). With Roberto Burgos Cantor in cooperation with María Camila Vera in Iowa Literaria
- ‘El ocio es la verdadera materia de la escritura’ (Colombia, 2016). With Maximiliano Barrientos in Revista Arcadia
- La Feria del Libro de Bogotá, una apuesta por la paz (USA, 2016). With Giuseppe Caputo in Iowa Literaria
- ‘La literatura es un espacio para la creación, no para la prohibición’ (Colombia, 2016). With Giuseppe Caputo in Latitud magazine of El Heraldo

== Mentions in the media ==
- La mirada de las pequeñas cosas (interview), (USA, 2018), in Literal Magazine
- “El rompecabezas de Tomacorrientes inalámbricos” (review) (Colombia, 2018), in El Dominical magazine of El Heraldo
- Los cuentos del año (press release), (Colombia, 2018), in El Heraldo
- Ganadores VII Premio de cuento La Cueva (press release), (Colombia, 2018), in Fundación La Cueva
- Léase en silencio (review) (Colombia, 2018), in El Informador
- Efraín Villanueva y su ‘Tomacorrientes inalámbrico’ unen a Colombia con Europa (press release), (Colombia, 2018), en La Cháchara
- Las letras barranquilleras vuelan en la Feria Internacional del Libro de Bogotá (press release), (Colombia, 2018), in Alcaldía de Barranquilla
- Las plumas caribes de la Filbo 2018 (press release), (Colombia, 2018), in El Heraldo
- Guía para buscar lo que no has perdido (review), (Colombia, 2019), in La Cháchara
- Los cuentos de Efraín Villanueva, guía versátil y eficaz (review), (USA, 2019), in Literal Magazine
- Los cuentos de Efraín Villanueva, guía versátil y eficaz (review), (Colombia, 2019), in El Espectador
- Lecturas crossover (review), (Colombia, 2019), in Vivir en El Poblado
- Concurso de literatura UIS 2018 - El vicio de los ganadores es escribir (interview), (Colombia, 2019), in El Frente
- Efraín Villanueva, promesa unicentralista de las letras (interview), (Colombia, 2019), en Noticentral

== Awards and honors ==
- Winner of Concurso El Tiempo del minicuento (Colombia, 2015)
- Winner of Premio de Novela Distrito de Barranquilla (Colombia, 2017)
- Finalist of Concurso Zenda Un mar de historias (Spain, 2017)
- Finalist of VII Premio Nacional de Cuento La Cueva (Colombia, 2018)
- Winner of XIV Premio Nacional de Libro de Cuentos (Colombia, 2018)
- Honorable mention in X Concurso nacional de cuento breve y bueno (Colombia, 2019)
- Winner of Concurso de cuentos cortos para espera largas (Colombia, 2019)
- Finalist of Concurso Zenda Nuestros héroes (Spain, 2020)
- Winner of Concurso Zenda de reseñas (Spain, 2022)
- Finalist of Concurso Zenda Historias de mujeres (Spain, 2023)
