= 1982 Colombian parliamentary election =

Parliamentary elections were held in Colombia on 14 March 1982 to elect the Senate and Chamber of Representatives. The result was a victory for the Liberal Party, which won 104 of the 199 Chamber seats and 55 of the 114 Senate seats.

The Liberal Party had split shortly before the elections, with a breakaway faction forming New Liberalism.

This election is notable for including the election of Pablo Escobar as a congressman.

== Results ==
=== Senate ===
Party	Votes	%	Seats	+/–
Colombian Liberal Party	2,582,116	46.38	55	–7
Colombian Conservative Party	2,252,601	40.46	49	0
New Liberalism	567,600	10.20	8	New
Democratic Front	75,615	1.36	1	New
Civic Movement	24,890	0.45	1	New
People's Unity Front	18,741	0.34	0	0
Liberal Democratic Front	17,427	0.31	0	New
Democratic Unity Party	10,978	0.20	0	New
Others	17,230	0.31	0	–
Total	5,567,198	100.00	114	+2
Valid votes	5,567,198	99.78		
Invalid/blank votes	12,159	0.22		
Total votes	5,579,357	100.00		
Registered voters/turnout	13,721,607	40.66		
Source: Nohlen

=== Chamber of Representatives ===
Notorious drug lord Pablo Escobar was elected as an alternative member of the Chamber of Representatives as part of the Liberal Party, later joining the Liberal Alternative faction.

Party	Votes	%	Seats	+/–
Colombian Liberal Party	2,560,352	45.94	104	–7
Colombian Conservative Party	2,248,796	40.35	82	–1
New Liberalism	581,074	10.43	11	New
Democratic Front	83,838	1.50	1	New
Civic Movement	25,888	0.46	1	New
People's Unity Front	21,081	0.38	0	–1
Liberal Democratic Front	17,609	0.32	0	New
Democratic Unity Party	11,460	0.21	0	New
Democratic Left Movement	4,169	0.07	0	New
Others	19,202	0.34	0	–
Total	5,573,469	100.00	199	0
Valid votes	5,573,469	99.81		
Invalid/blank votes	10,568	0.19		
Total votes	5,584,037	100.00		
Registered voters/turnout	13,721,607	40.70		
Source: Nohlen
