= Hatzer Adar =

Former Israeli settlement in the Sinai Peninsula

Coordinates: 31°12′37.63″N 34°14′33.53″E

- Former Israeli settlement
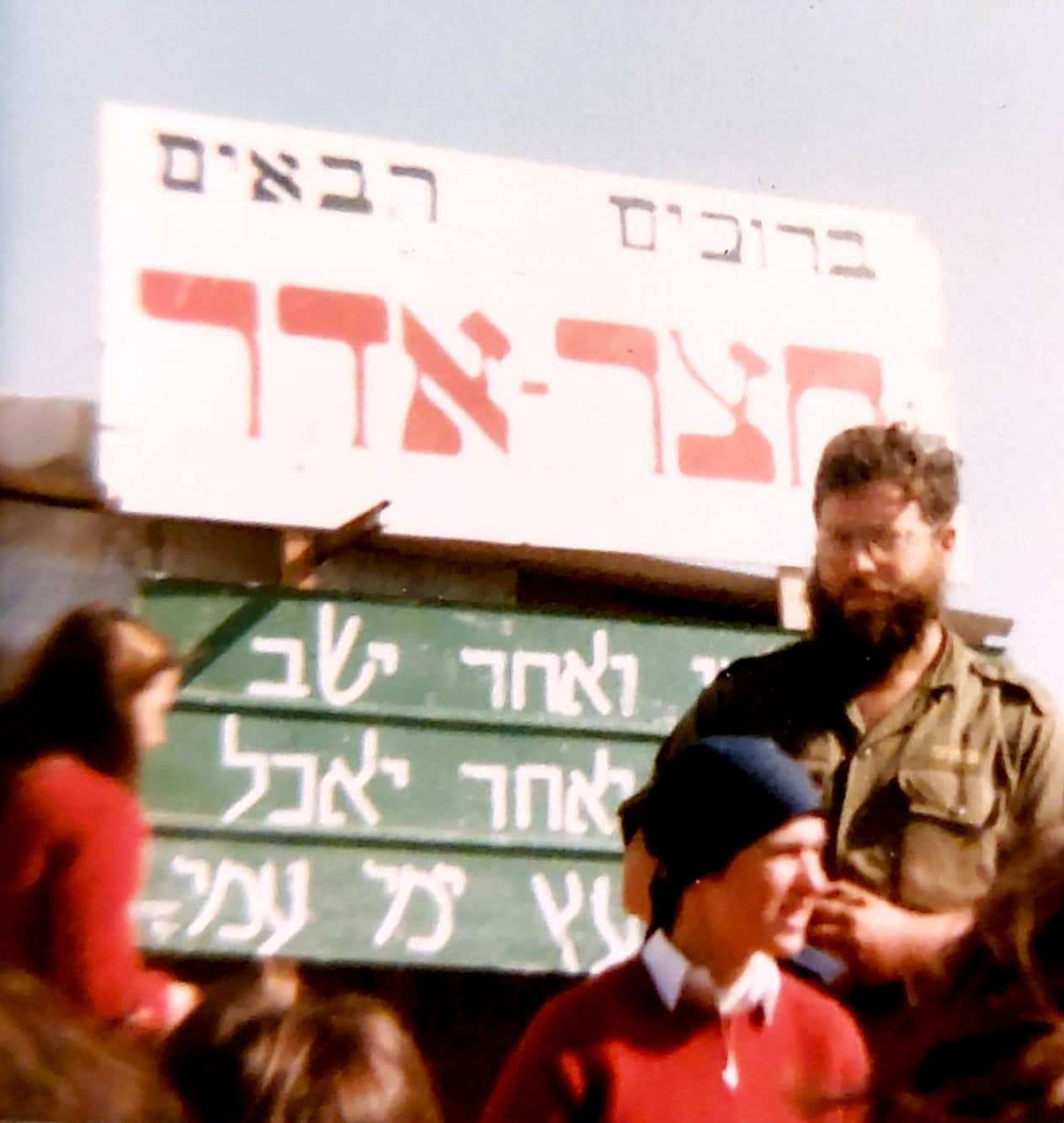
- Interactive map of Hatzer Adar
- Country: Israel
- Region: Sinai Peninsula
- Founded: 1981

Hatzer Adar (Hebrew: חצר אדר, lit. 'Maple Garden') was an Israeli settlement and moshav in the Sinai Peninsula. Located near Yamit, it was evacuated in 1982 as a result of the Camp David Accords.

In the northeast Sinai, 12 kilometers from the moshav Neot Sinai, next to the junction Haruvit. It was one of the settlements of Hevel Yamit and was established in December 1981, by the movement to stop the withdrawal from Sinai about six months before the IDF withdrew from Sinai.

The moshav was established by a group of settlers from the West Bank and other places, who welcomed the government's intention to hand over the opening of Rafah and Sinai to Egypt, as agreed in the peace agreement between Israel to Egypt Peace Treaty. It was the youngest settlement among the Sinai settlements. On December 24, 1981, a Torah scroll was brought to the synagogue.

The secretary of the moshav was Yigal Kirshenzaft, who was previously a resident of the city Yamit and was sent on a mission by the rabbi of the city yeshiva Israel Ariel. Among the residents of the moshav was also Baruch Marzel, who was entrusted with maintaining wireless contact with those who opposed the evacuation by sea and updating the residents on military operations. The coordinator of the settlement was Michael Ben Horin.

The moshav was evacuated by the IDF for the first time on March 3, 1982, in one of the most difficult evacuation operations the IDF has known in Sinai. On the day of the evacuation, MK Yuval Ne'eman of the Tehiya movement, who opposed the withdrawal, was present in the Hatzer Adar. On the evening of that day, Ne'eman warned on the broadcast of Mabat on Channel One television that "if things continue as they were this morning in the Hatzer Adar, we are very close to bloodshed." He described dragging people into barbed wire, injuring them and using axes, and warned the government Begin not to shed Jewish blood.

The moshav Hatzer Adar was in the Yamit Region and followed the other settlements in the region: Yamit, Atzmona, Nativ Haasara, Sadot, Dekla, Pri-El, Pri Gan, Telmei Yosef, Ugda, Nir Avraham, Neot Sinai, Harovit, Sufa, Avshalom and Holit.

On March 11, 1982, at 6:00 a.m., a group of about 50 settlers, along with Geula Cohen and Rabbi Israel Ariel, arrived to re-establish the settlement, in which one hut remained. At noon, the army evacuated the settlers. After the second evacuation, in a demonstration in Jerusalem of opponents of the withdrawal from Sinai on March 16, 1982, Rabbi Isser Klonsky, a neighborhood rabbi, promised that the Hatzer Adar would be established again. The settlers established Hatzer Adar III, Hatzer Adar IV and finally Hatzer Adar V. They were all evacuated one by one.

Hadar Adar was one of the four localities where there was a concentration of opponents of the withdrawal.
