= NGC 5679 Group =

Triplet of galaxies in the constellation Virgo

NGC 5679
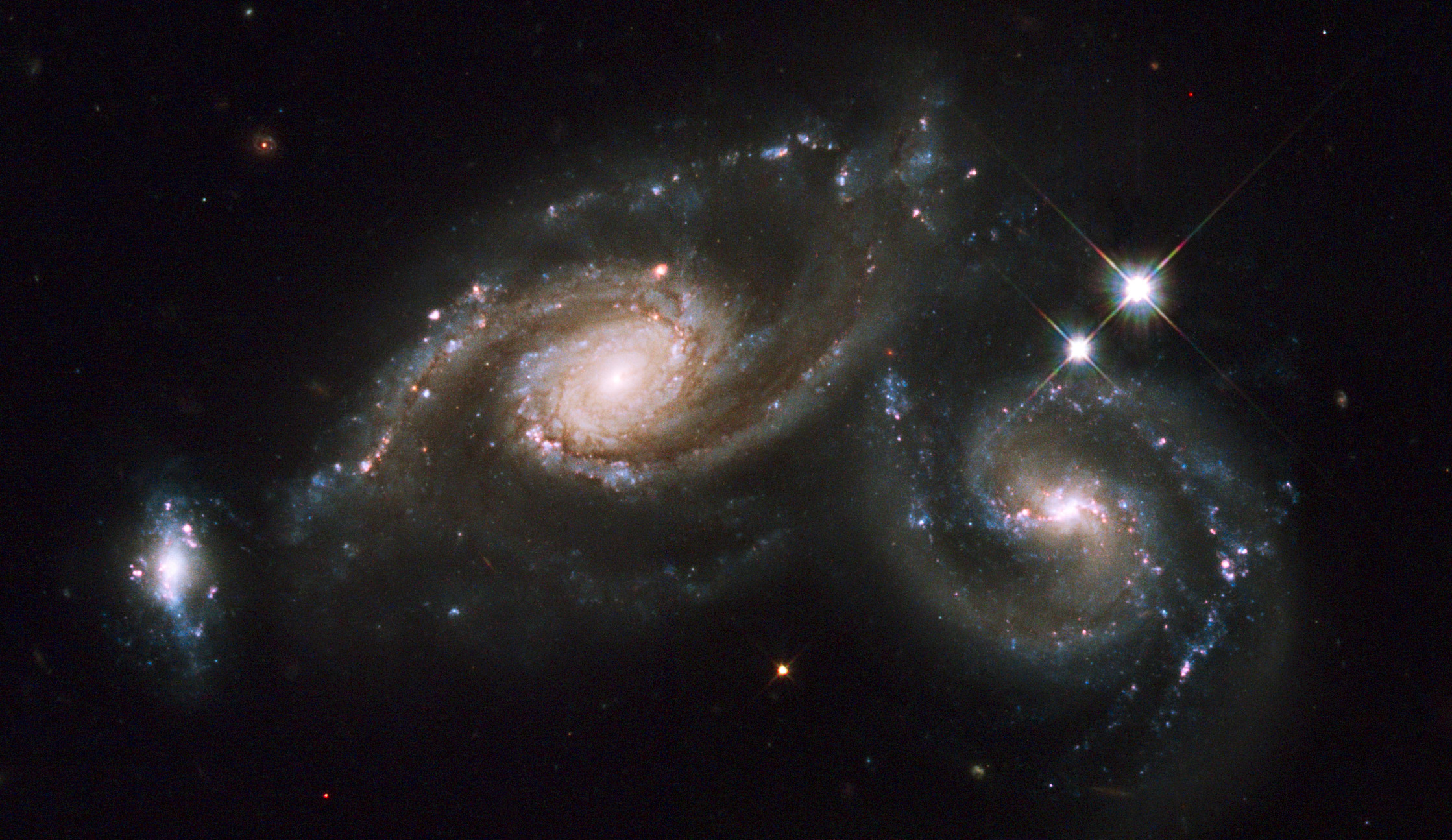
- Arp 274 (NGC 5679C, NGC 5679B and NGC 5679A) imaged by the Hubble Space Telescope

Observation data (J2000 epoch)
- Constellation: Virgo
- Right ascension: Center: 14^{h} 35^{m} 08.763^{s} Left: 14^{h} 35^{m} 11.0^{s} Right: 14^{h} 35^{m} 06.354^{s}
- Declination: Center: +05° 21′ 32.41″ Left: +05° 21′ 16″ Right: +05° 21′ 24.41″
- Redshift: Center: 0.028900; Right: 0.02487
- Heliocentric radial velocity: Center: 8654; Left: 7483; Right: 7618
- Apparent magnitude (B): Center: 14.5; Left: 16; Right: 14.5

Characteristics
- Type: Center: Sbc; Right: S
- Apparent size (V): Center: 1.013' × 0.669'; Left: 0.17' × 0.11'; Right: 0.393' × 0.338'
- Notable features: Interacting galaxy triple

Other designations
- Center: NGC 5679B, PGC 52132, UGC 9383, MCG+01-37-035, VV 458; Left: NGC 5679C, PGC 52129, MCG+01-37-036; Right: NGC 5679A, PGC 52130, MCG+01-37-034, SDSS J143506.38+052124.5

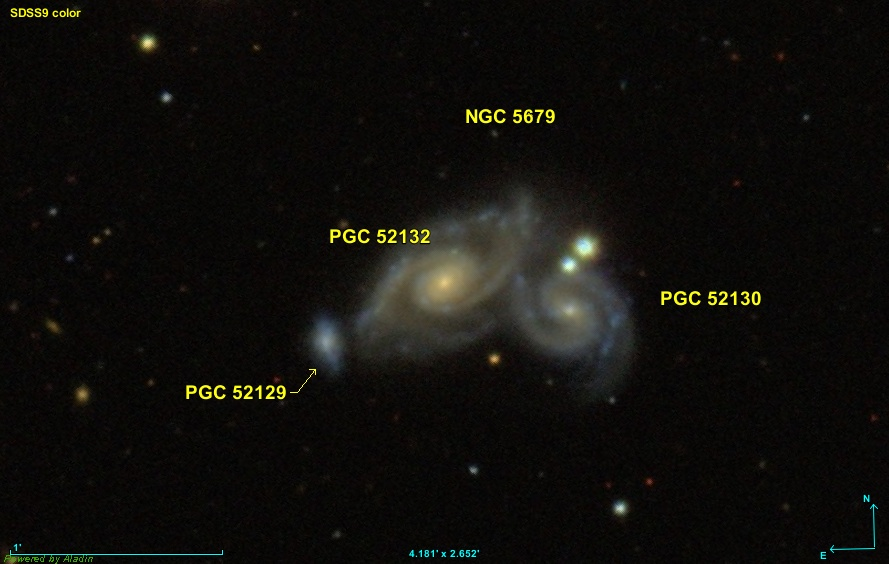
NGC 5670, otherwise known as Arp 274, with the individual galaxies labled.

The NGC 5679 group, also known as Arp 274, is a triplet of galaxies, MCG+1-37-36, MCG+1-37-35 and MCG+1-37-34, spanning about 200000 light-years and at some 400 million light-years from Earth in the constellation Virgo. Arp 274 refers to the Atlas of Peculiar Galaxies, compiled by Halton Arp in 1966. Galaxies 269 through 274 in his catalogue are galaxies that appear to have connected arms. NGC 5679 was imaged by Hubble in 2009, in a combination of blue, visible, infrared and Hα filters. The photograph shows that all three galaxies, especially the galaxies on the left and right, are starburst galaxies, meaning that there is currently a large amount of star formation in the galaxies. Interstellar dust can be seen between the areas of star formation. Two bright stars can be seen just above the galaxy on the right side; these are foreground stars that are actually part of our own galaxy.

== Speed ==
Redshift measurements of the three galaxies give these radial velocity values, from left to right: 7483, 8654, and 7618 km/s. The relatively high redshift for the center galaxy means that it is much farther away - about 65 million light years (20 megaparsecs) behind the other two galaxies. Thus, the center galaxy is likely a background object. The NGC 5679 group was previously thought to be interacting gravitationally, however the newer Hubble image seems to confirm suspicions that the center galaxy is not interacting, as the galaxy arms are not distorted like typical interacting galaxies.

== Supernovae ==
One supernova has been observed in NGC 5679:

- SN 1982D (type unknown, mag. 18) was discovered by Halton Arp and Jack W. Sulentic on 23 March 1982.
