= International Book Fair of Bogotá =

Colombian book fair

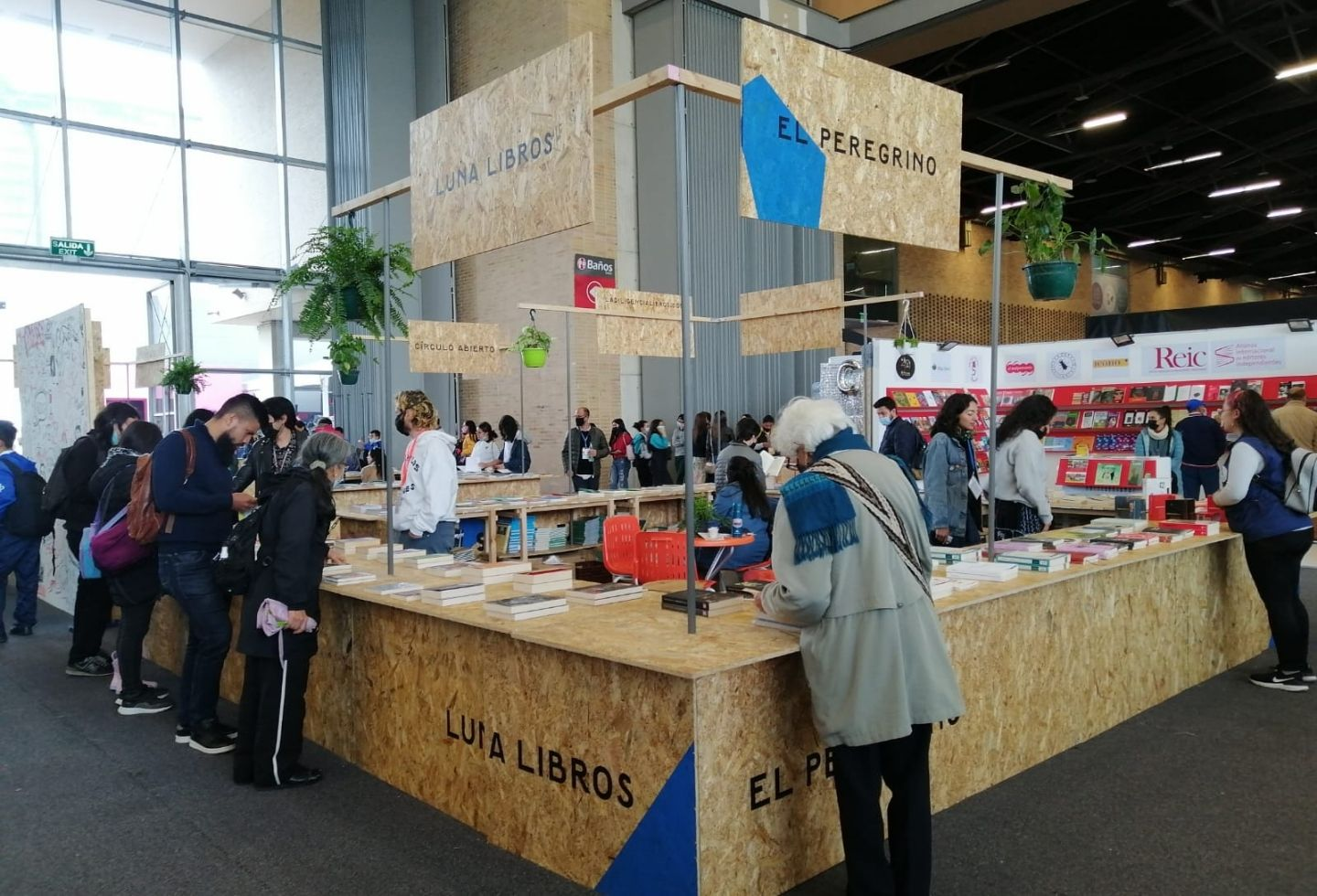
La Diligencia Libros stand in the independent publishers pavilion at The International Book Fair of Bogota 2022 version

The International Book Fair of Bogotá, also known as FILBo, is a book fair held in the city of Bogotá, Colombia that takes place annually in the convention center of Corferias. In this event, all the actors of the productive chain of books meet, and for two weeks readers, authors, editors, style editors, distributors, agents, and booksellers participate in this Colombian longstanding cultural event and the second-largest book fair in Latin America.

== History ==
The first edition of The International Book Fair of Bogotá was held in 1988 in Corferias. The media registered that the first edition counted the participation of 26 international writers, 300 Colombian writers, and 150 exhibitors.

== Recent editions ==
In recent editions, the International Book Fair of Bogotá has had different countries as guests of honor to whom it dedicates a pavilion to highlight their literature and culture

- 2018: The 30° edition of the FILBo had Argentina as an honorary guest country. The 16 days of the event counted with the participation of 575,000 attendees over 1.796 events.
- 2019: The 31° edition of the FILBo had Colombia as an honorary guest country. The 13 days of the event counted with the participation of 605.000 attendees over 1.850 events.
- 2020: The 32° version of the FILBo was a virtual edition due to the global pandemic of COVID-19. The organization brought the Book Fair to people's houses through all the digital tools. There were live broadcasts, forums on the website, and book clubs on social networks
- 2021: The 33° version of the FILBo had Sweden as an honorary guest country. The 17 days of the event counted with the participation of 1.805.000 attendees over 669 virtual events and 129 face-to-face events in bookstores, schools, universities, and public and school libraries
- 2022: The 34° version of the FILBo had South Korea as an honorary guest country. The 14 days of the event counted with the participation of 517.000 attendees over 1.710 events. This version, which had the re-encounter as a focus after having two previous virtual versions, closed with total business expectations of USD 2.369.779.
