= 1906 =

1906 in various calendars
- Gregorian calendar: 1906; MCMVI
- Ab urbe condita: 2659
- Armenian calendar: 1355; ԹՎ ՌՅԾԵ
- Assyrian calendar: 6656
- Baháʼí calendar: 62–63
- Balinese saka calendar: 1827–1828
- Bengali calendar: 1312–1313
- Berber calendar: 2856
- British Regnal year: 5 Edw. 7 – 6 Edw. 7
- Buddhist calendar: 2450
- Burmese calendar: 1268
- Byzantine calendar: 7414–7415
- Chinese calendar: 乙巳年 (Wood Snake); 4603 or 4396 — to — 丙午年 (Fire Horse); 4604 or 4397
- Coptic calendar: 1622–1623
- Discordian calendar: 3072
- Ethiopian calendar: 1898–1899
- Hebrew calendar: 5666–5667
- Hindu calendars
- Vikram Samvat: 1962–1963
- Shaka Samvat: 1827–1828
- Kali Yuga: 5006–5007
- Holocene calendar: 11906
- Igbo calendar: 906–907
- Iranian calendar: 1284–1285
- Islamic calendar: 1323–1324
- Japanese calendar: Meiji 39 (明治３９年)
- Javanese calendar: 1835–1836
- Julian calendar: Gregorian minus 13 days
- Korean calendar: 4239
- Minguo calendar: 6 before ROC 民前6年
- Nanakshahi calendar: 438
- Thai solar calendar: 2448–2449
- Tibetan calendar: ཤིང་མོ་སྦྲུལ་ལོ་ (female Wood-Snake); 2032 or 1651 or 879 — to — མེ་ཕོ་རྟ་ལོ་ (male Fire-Horse); 2033 or 1652 or 880

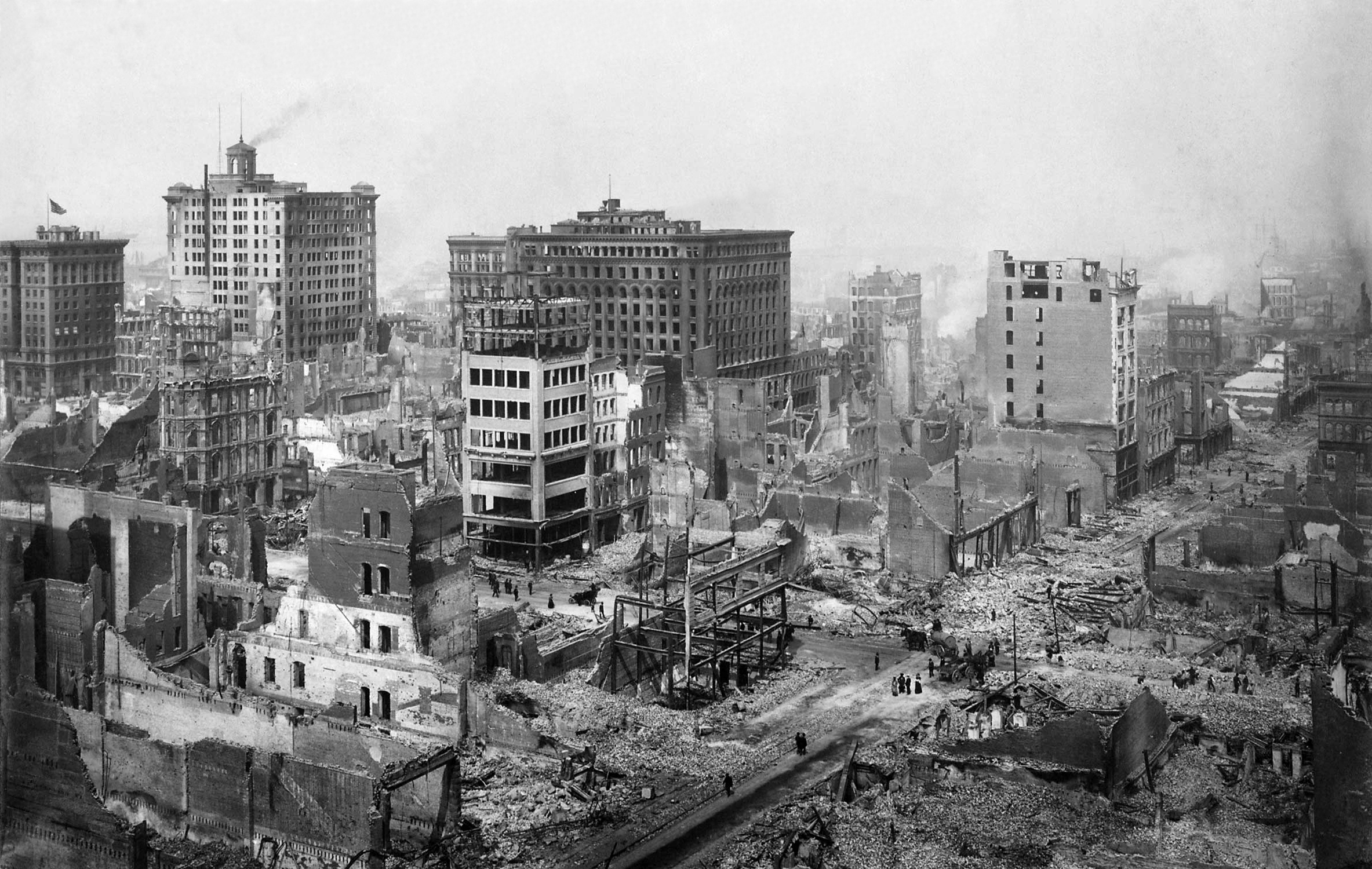
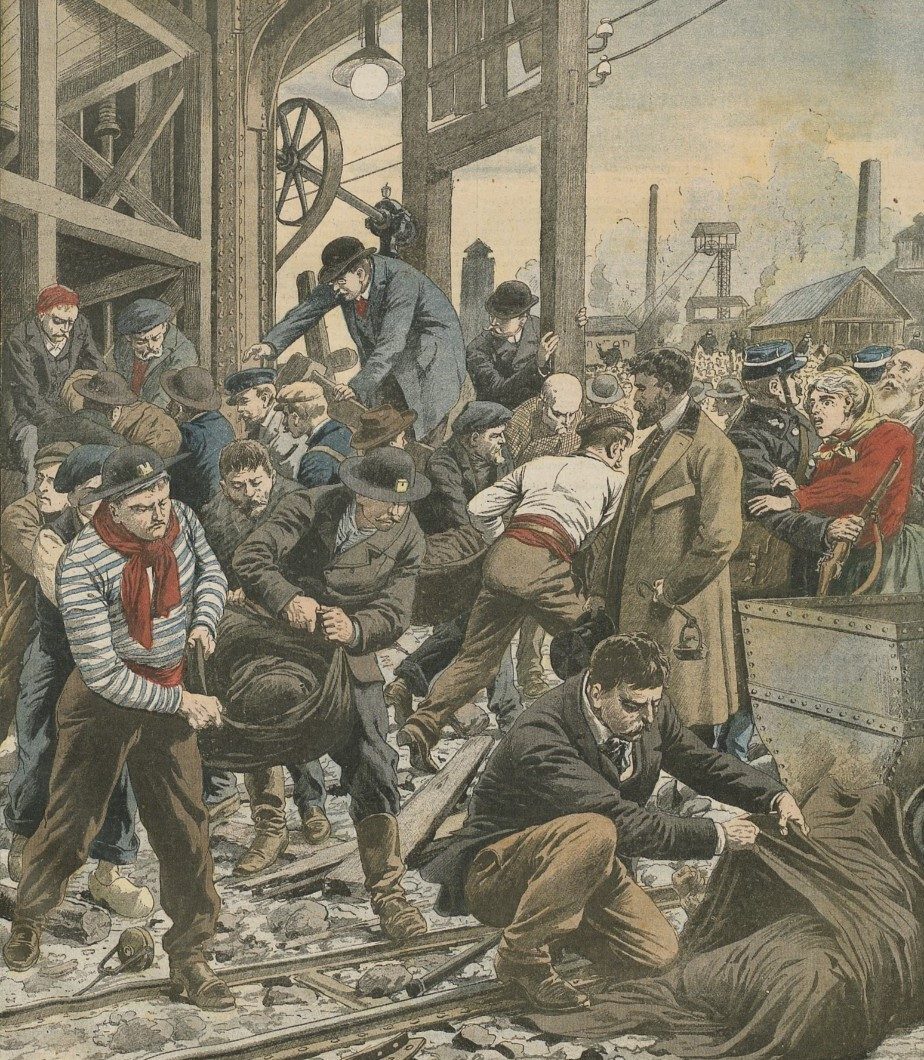
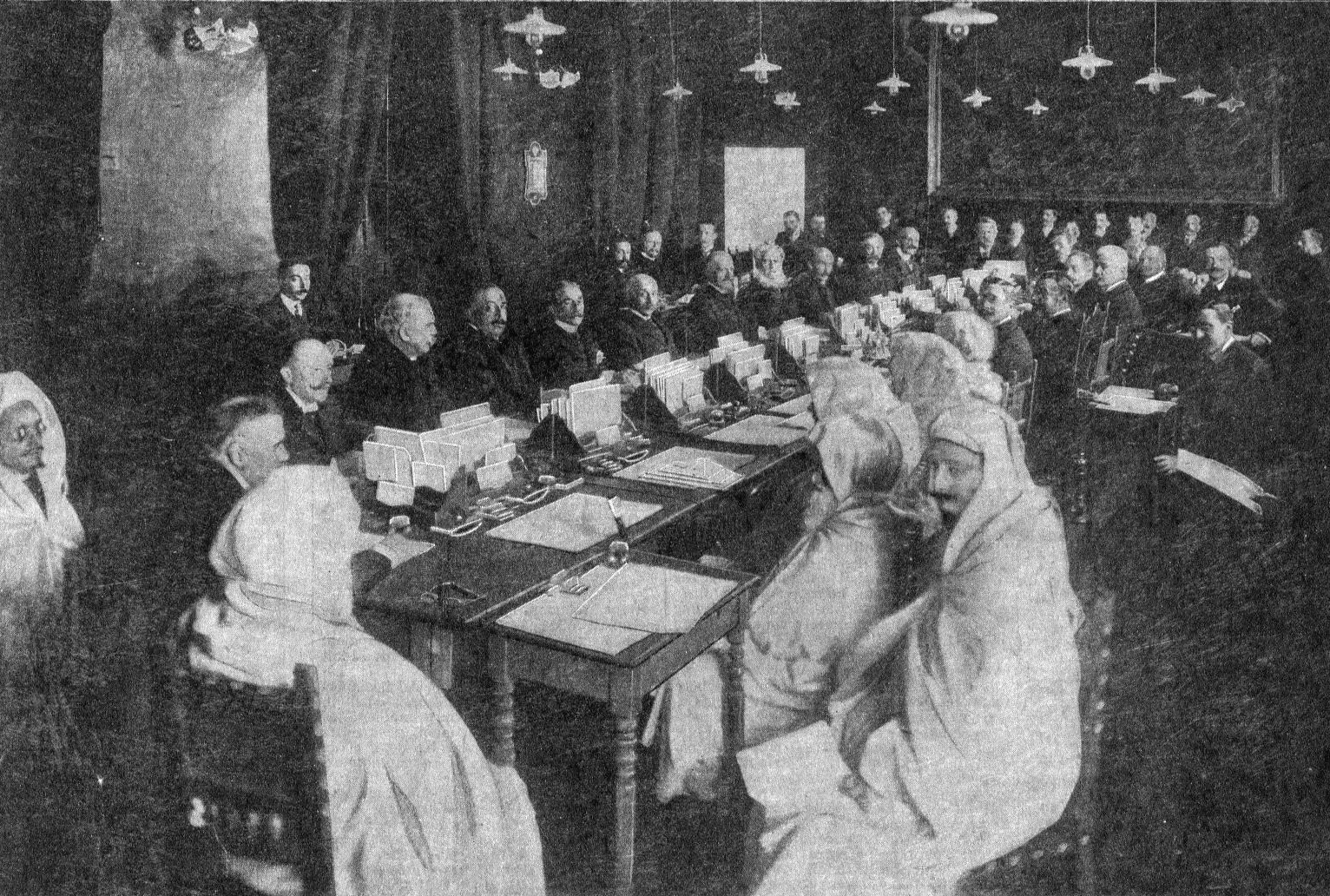
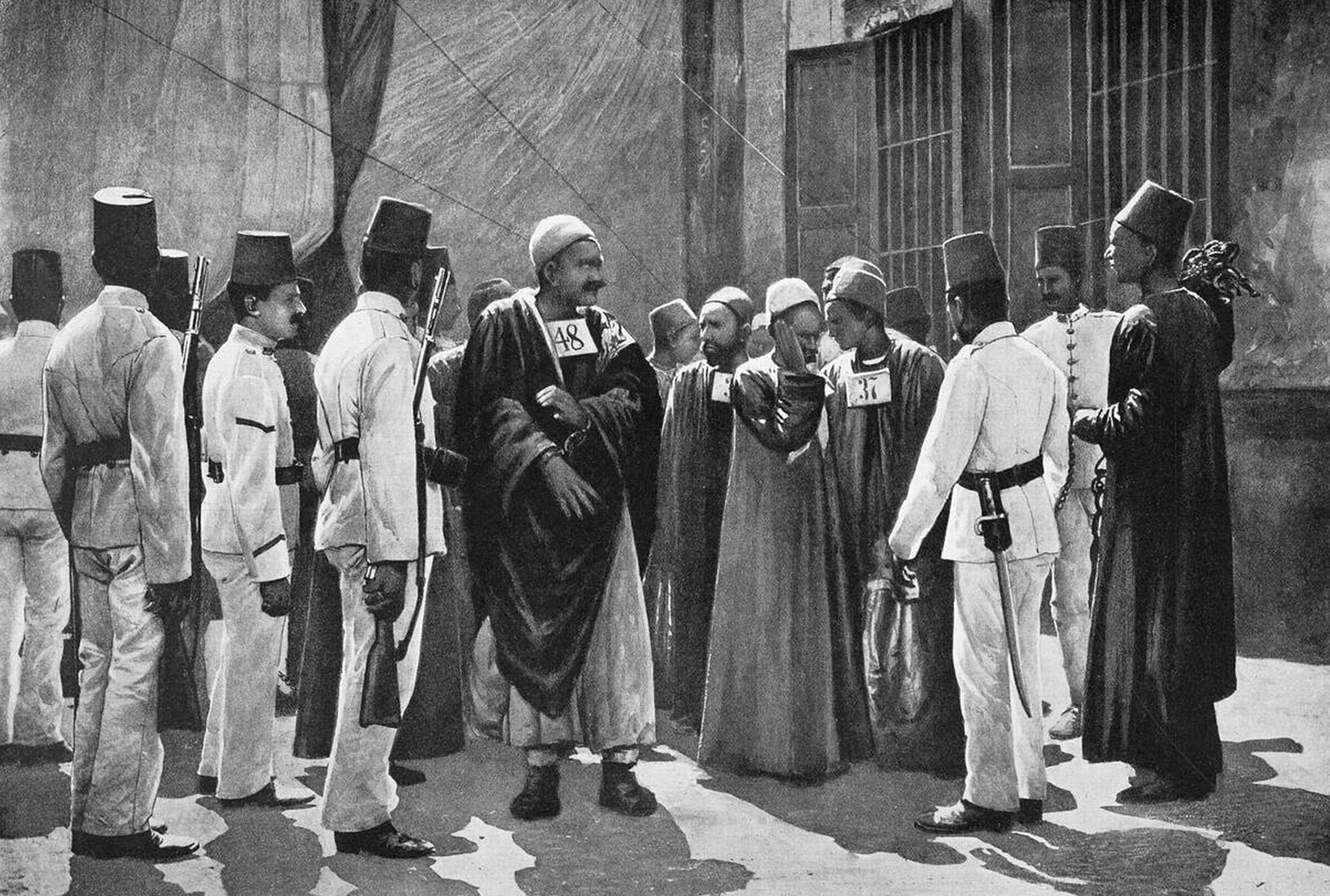
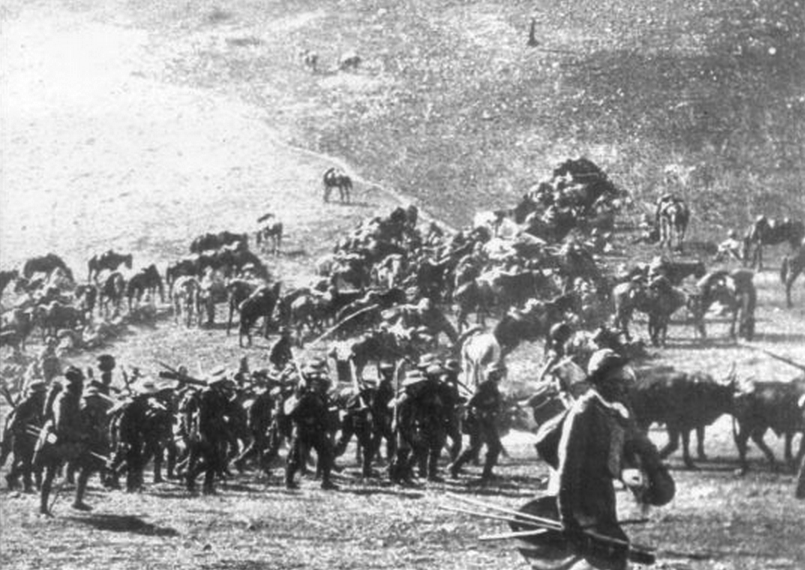
From top to bottom, left to right:
- The 1906 San Francisco earthquake and fires devastate the city, killing thousands and displacing many more;
- The Courrières mine disaster in France kills over 1,000 miners, one of Europe’s worst industrial tragedies;
- The 1906 Atlanta race massacre leaves dozens dead amid racial tensions;
- The Algeciras Conference attempts to resolve European disputes over Morocco;
- The Denshawai incident in Egypt sparks nationalist outrage after harsh British reprisals;
- The Bambatha Rebellion in Natal sees Zulu resistance crushed by colonial forces.

1906 (MCMVI) was a common year starting on Monday of the Gregorian calendar and a common year starting on Sunday of the Julian calendar, the 1906th year of the Common Era (CE) and Anno Domini (AD) designations, the 906th year of the 2nd millennium, the 6th year of the 20th century, and the 7th year of the 1900s decade. As of the start of 1906, the Gregorian calendar was 13 days ahead of the Julian calendar, which remained in localized use until 1923.

Polish supercentenarian Tekla Juniewicz (10 June 1906 – 19 August 2022) was the last known person born in 1906 when she died on August 19, 2022.

== Events ==
=== January–February ===
- January 12 – Persian Constitutional Revolution: A nationalistic coalition of merchants, religious leaders and intellectuals in Persia forces the shah Mozaffar ad-Din Shah Qajar to grant a constitution, and establish a national assembly, the Majlis.
- January 16–April 7 – The Algeciras Conference convenes, to resolve the First Moroccan Crisis between France and Germany.
- January 22 – The SS Valencia strikes a reef off Vancouver Island, Canada, killing over 100 (officially 136) in the ensuing disaster.
- January 31 – The Ecuador–Colombia earthquake (8.8 on the Moment magnitude scale), and associated tsunami, cause at least 500 deaths.
- February 7 – HMS Dreadnought is launched, sparking a naval race between Britain and Germany.
- February 11
  - Pope Pius X publishes the encyclical Vehementer Nos, denouncing the 1905 French law on the Separation of the Churches and the State.
  - Two British members of a poll tax collecting expedition are killed near Richmond, Natal, sparking the Bambatha Rebellion.

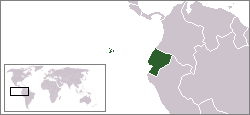
January 31: Ecuador earthquake (8.8).

=== March–April ===
- March 10 – Courrières mine disaster: An explosion in a coal mine in France kills 1,060.
- March 18 – In France, Romanian inventor Traian Vuia becomes the first person to achieve an unassisted takeoff in a heavier-than-air powered monoplane, but it is incapable of sustained flight.
- April 14 – The Azusa Street Revival, the primary catalyst for the revival of Pentecostalism this century, opens in Los Angeles.
- April 18
  - The San Francisco Earthquake (estimated magnitude 7.8) on the San Andreas Fault destroys much of San Francisco, California, killing at least 3,000, with 225,000–300,000 left homeless, and $350 million in damages.
  - Xerox, the global digital office machine brand, is founded in Rochester, New York as the Haloid Photographic Company.
- April 23 – In the Russian Empire, the Fundamental Laws are announced at the first state Duma.
- April 25 – Georgian Socialist-Federalist Revolutionary Party under the leadership of Leo Kereselidze successfully robs the Dusheti treasury of the Russian Empire, one of the largest expropriations of the time.

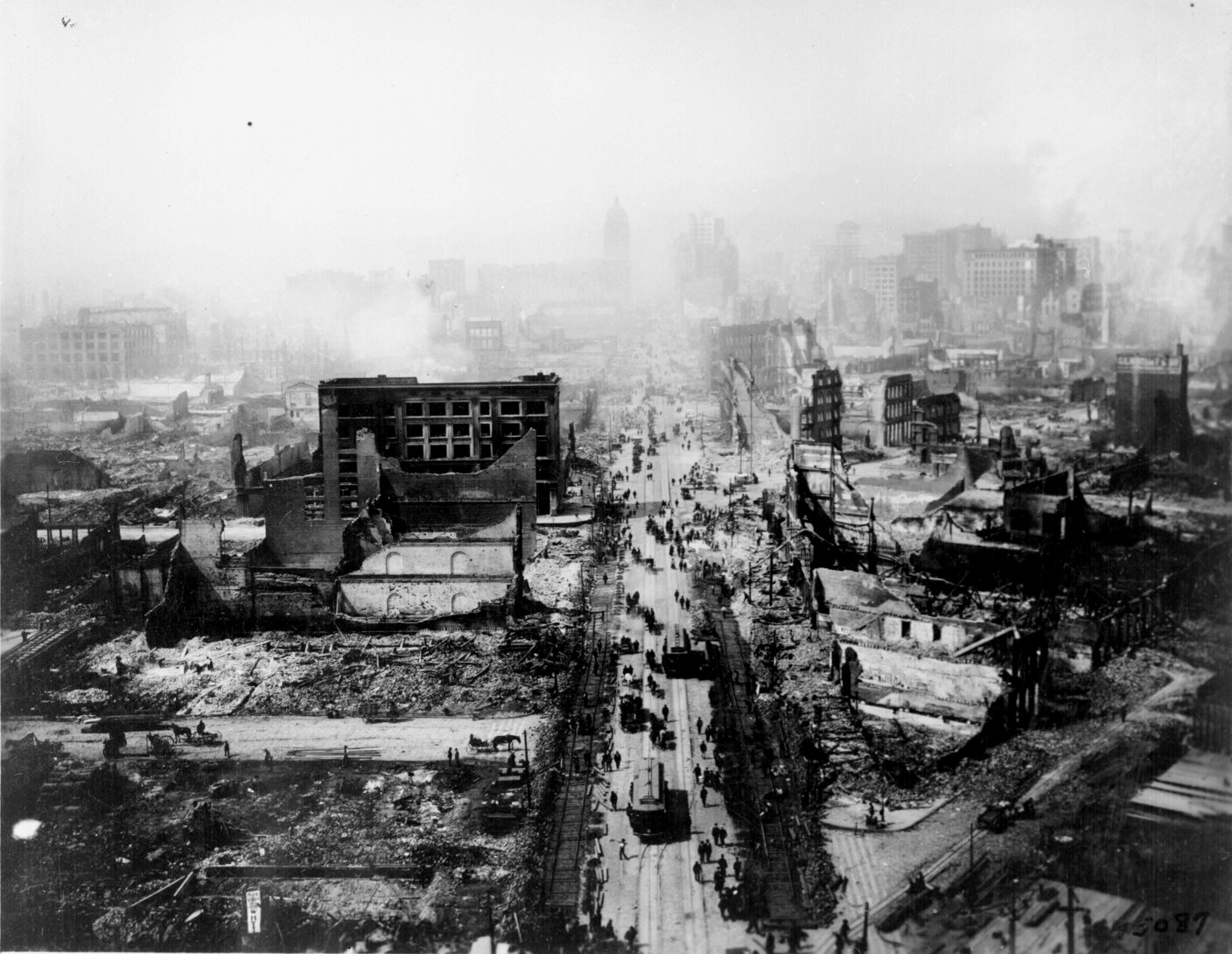
The ruins of San Francisco following the April 18 earthquake and later fires

=== May–June ===
- May 27
  - The first inmates are moved to the Culion leper colony by the American Insular Government of the Philippine Islands.
  - Gustav Mahler's Symphony No. 6 receives its premiere at the Saalbau Essen in Germany conducted by the composer.
- May 29 – Karl Staaff steps down as Prime Minister of Sweden over the issue of expanded voting rights. He is replaced by right-wing naval officer and public official Arvid Lindman.
- May 31 – Morral affair: The attempted regicide of Spanish King Alfonso XIII and Queen Victoria Eugenie on their wedding day instead kills 24 bystanders.
- June 7 – Cunard liner RMS Lusitania is launched in Glasgow, as the world's largest ship.
- June 26 – The first automobile racing Grand Prix is the 1906 French Grand Prix held at Le Mans.

=== July–August ===
- July 6 – The Second Geneva Convention meets.
- July 12 – Alfred Dreyfus is exonerated. He is reinstalled in the French Army on July 21, thus ending the Dreyfus affair.
- July 20 – In the Grand Duchy of Finland, a new electoral law is ratified, guaranteeing full women's suffrage, the first in modern Europe. Women can also stand in national elections.
- August 4 – The first Imperial German Navy submarine, U-1, is launched.
- August 16
  - 1906 Aleutian Islands earthquake: An earthquake with an estimated magnitude of 8.35 occurs off the Rat Islands in Alaska.
  - 1906 Valparaíso earthquake: A magnitude 8.2 earthquake in Valparaíso, Chile leaves nearly 4,000 dead and approximately 20,000 injured.
- August 23 – Unable to control a rebellion, Cuban President Tomás Estrada Palma requests United States intervention. This leads to the Second Occupation of Cuba, which lasts until 1909.

=== September–October ===
- September 11 – Mahatma Gandhi coins the term Satyagraha, to characterize the nonviolence movement in South Africa.
- September 18 – A typhoon and tsunami kill an estimated 10,000 in Hong Kong.
- September 20 – The RMS Mauretania is launched on the River Tyne, becoming the world's largest ship.
- September 30 – The first Gordon Bennett Cup in ballooning is held, starting in Paris. The winning team, piloting the balloon United States, lands in Fylingdales, Yorkshire, England.
- October 1 – The Grand Duchy of Finland becomes the first nation to include the right of women to stand as candidates when it adopts universal suffrage.
- October 6 – The National Consultative Assembly (Majlis) of Iran convenes for the first time.
- October 11 – A United States diplomatic crisis with Japan arises when the San Francisco public school board orders Japanese students to be taught in racially segregated schools (it is resolved by next year).
- October 16 – Imposter Wilhelm Voigt impersonates a Prussian officer and takes over the city hall in Köpenick for a short time.
- October 23 – An aeroplane of Alberto Santos-Dumont takes off at Bagatelle in France, and flies 60 meters (200 feet). This is the first officially recorded powered flight in Europe.
- October 28 – The Union Minière du Haut Katanga, a mining trust, is created in the Belgian Congo.
- October 28 – A train falls off a drawbridge in New Jersey, drowning 53 people, and results in what is widely considered the first ever press release.

=== November–December ===
- November 1 – International Exhibition opens in Christchurch, New Zealand.
- November 3 – S̅O̅S̅ becomes adopted internationally as a distress signal (originally for ship-to-shore wireless telegraphy) on inclusion in the service regulations of the first International Radiotelegraph Convention signed in Berlin and coming into effect on 1 July 1908.
- November 18 – The steamboat Dix sinks en route from Seattle to Port Blakely claiming the lives of approximately 50 passengers and crew.
- December 4 – Alpha Phi Alpha fraternity forms at Cornell University, Ithaca, New York; it is the first Black Greek-lettered collegiate order of its kind.
- December 6 – The Transvaal Colony is granted responsible self-government by Britain.
- December 13 – The United Kingdom, France and Italy sign an agreement to preserve, in Ethiopia, the integrity of the ancient empire of Abyssinia.
- December 15 – The London Underground's Great Northern, Piccadilly and Brompton Railway opens.
- December 22 – The M_{w} 7.9 1906 Manasi earthquake in Xinjiang, China, kills nearly 300 people.
- December 24 – Reginald Fessenden makes the first radio broadcast: a poetry reading, a violin solo, and a speech, from Brant Rock, Massachusetts.
- December 26 – The world's first feature film, The Story of the Kelly Gang, is first shown, at the Melbourne Athenaeum in Australia.
- December 30 – The All-India Muslim League is founded as a political party in Dhaka in the British Raj; it becomes a driving force for the creation of an independent Pakistan.

=== Date unknown ===
- The BCG vaccine for tuberculosis is first developed.
- Construction begins on the modern-day Great Mosque of Djenné.
- The Simplo Filler Pen Company is founded, later to become the Montblanc Company in Germany.
- HaRishon Le Zion-Yafo Association is officially founded as a sports club in Palestine, predecessor of Maccabi Tel Aviv (Israel).

== Births ==
=== January–February ===
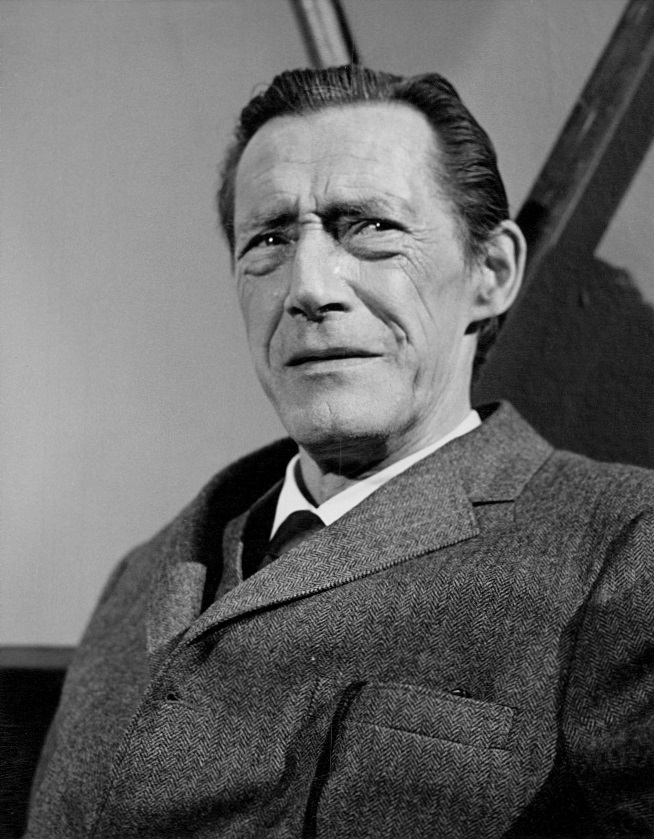
John Carradine

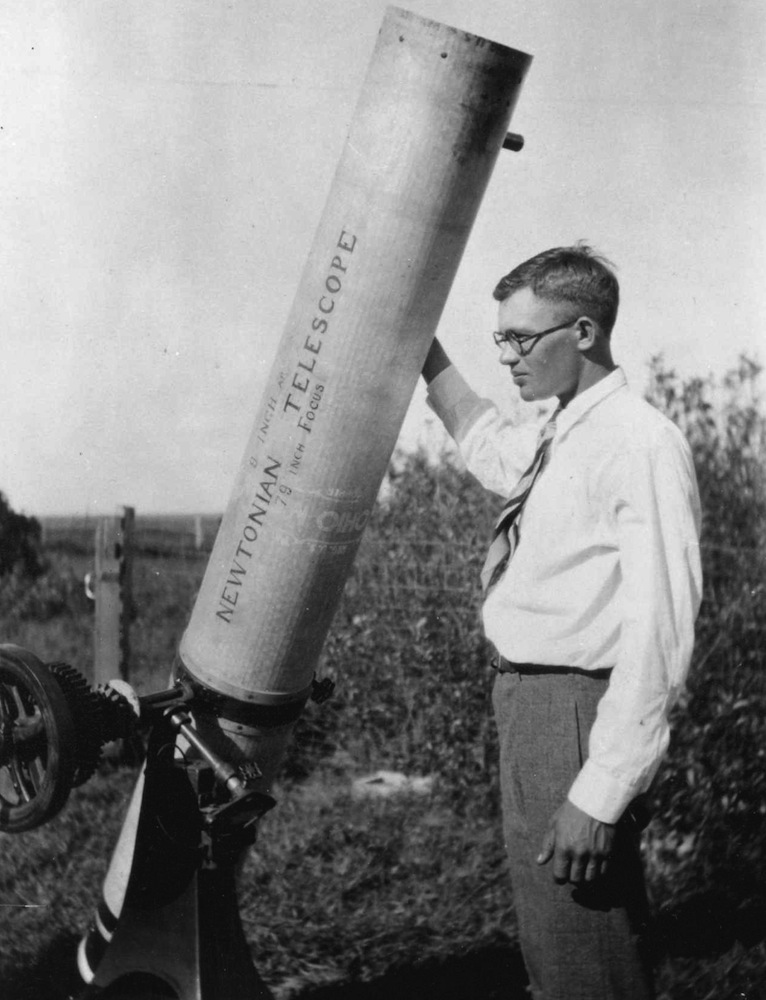
Clyde Tombaugh

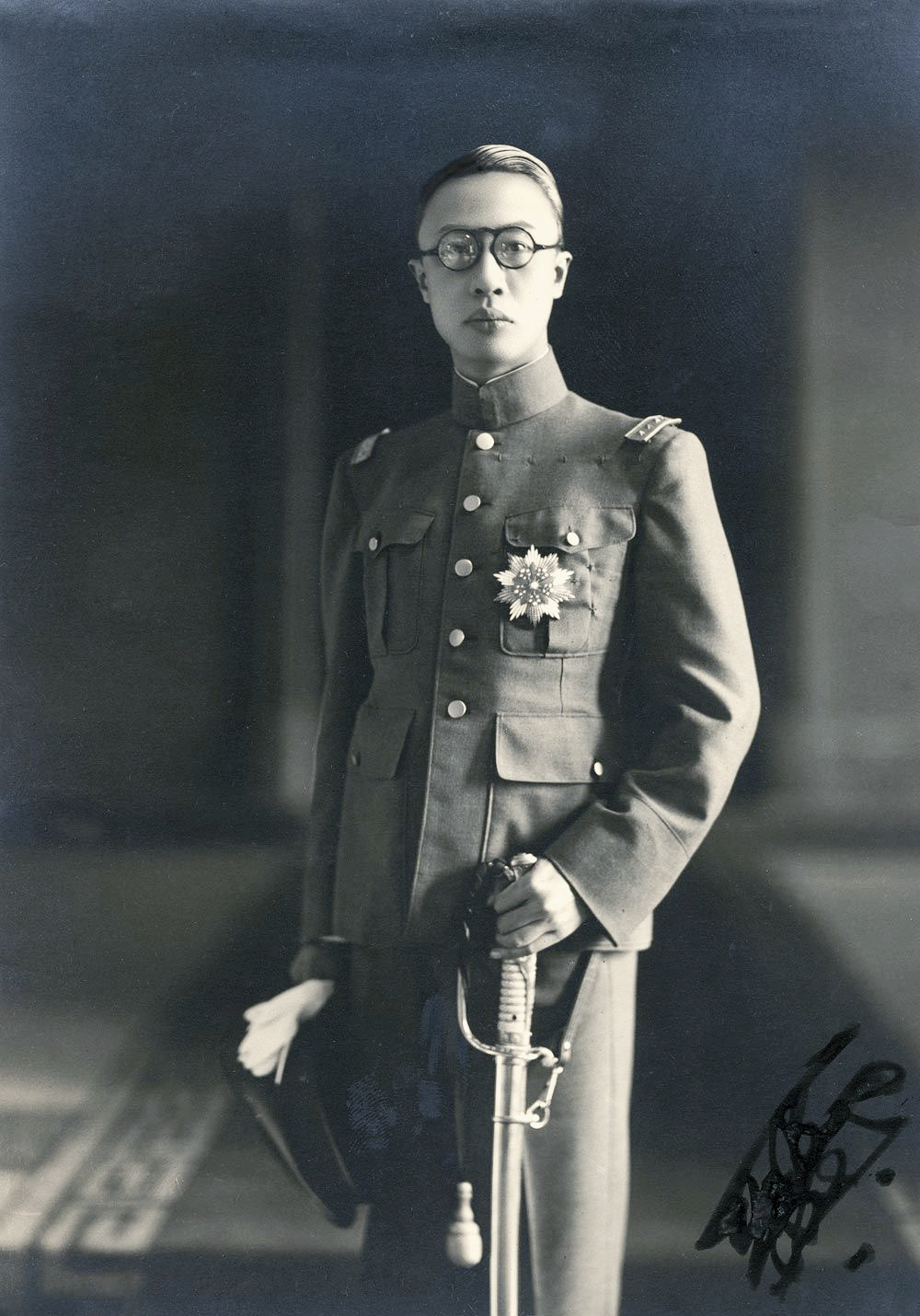
Puyi

- January 11 – Albert Hofmann, Swiss chemist (d. 2008)
- January 12 – Eric Birley, British historian and archaeologist (d. 1995)
- January 13 – Zhou Youguang, Chinese linguist (d. 2017)
- January 14 – William Bendix, American film, radio and television actor (d. 1964)
- January 15 – Aristotle Onassis, Greek shipping magnate (d. 1975)
- January 16 – Diana Wynyard, English actress (d. 1964)
- January 21 – Igor Moiseyev, Russian choreographer (d. 2007)
- January 22 – Robert E. Howard, American pulp fiction writer (suicide 1936)
- January 28 – Pat O'Callaghan, Irish athlete (d. 1991)
- February 4
  - Dietrich Bonhoeffer, German religious, resistance leader (executed 1945)
  - Clyde Tombaugh, American astronomer (d. 1997)
- February 5 – John Carradine, American actor (d. 1988)
- February 7
  - Oleg Antonov, Soviet aircraft designer (d. 1984)
  - Puyi, Last Emperor of China (d. 1967)
- February 8 – Chester Carlson, American physicist, inventor (d. 1968)
- February 10 – Lon Chaney Jr., American actor (d. 1973)
- February 14 – Nazim al-Qudsi, 26th Prime Minister of Syria and 14th President of Syria (d. 1998)
- February 17
  - Galo Plaza, 29th President of Ecuador (d. 1987)
  - Käte Selbmann, German politician (d. 1962)
- February 18 – Hans Asperger, Austrian pediatrician (d. 1980)
- February 26 – Madeleine Carroll, British actress (d. 1987)
- February 28 – Bugsy Siegel, American gangster (k. 1947)

=== March–April ===
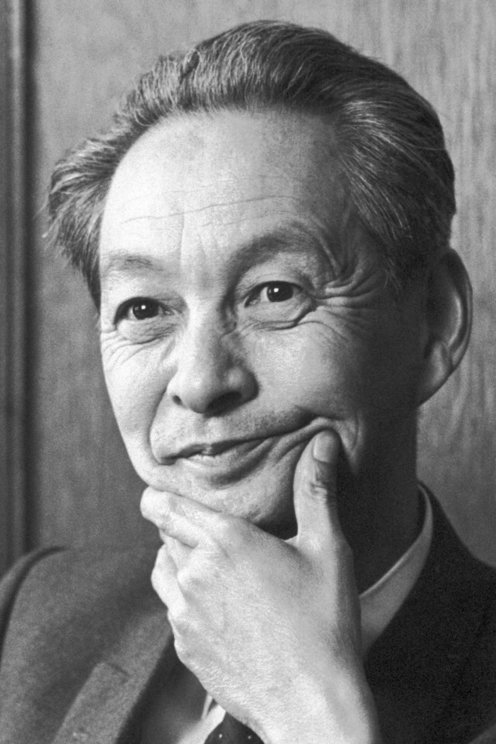
Shin'ichirō Tomonaga

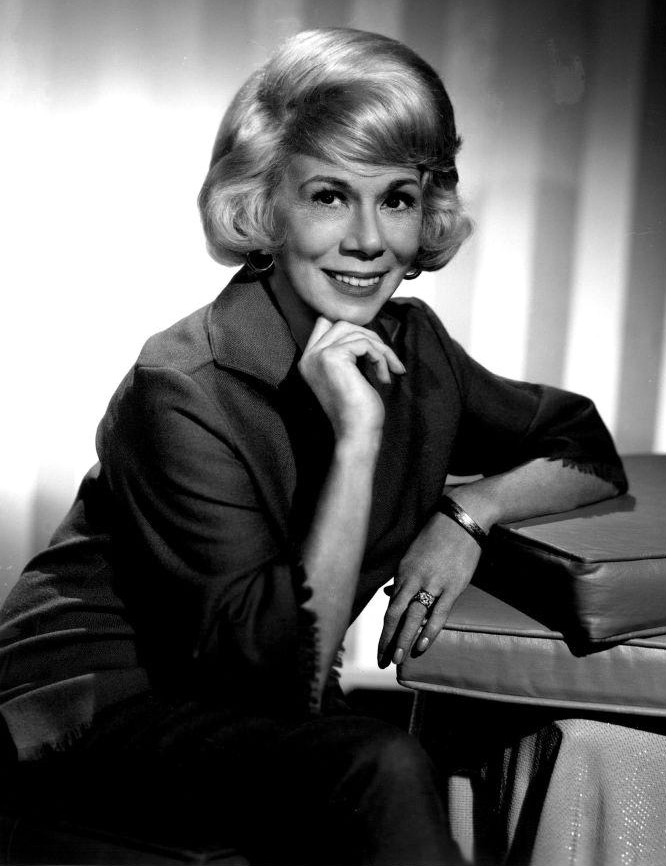
Bea Benaderet

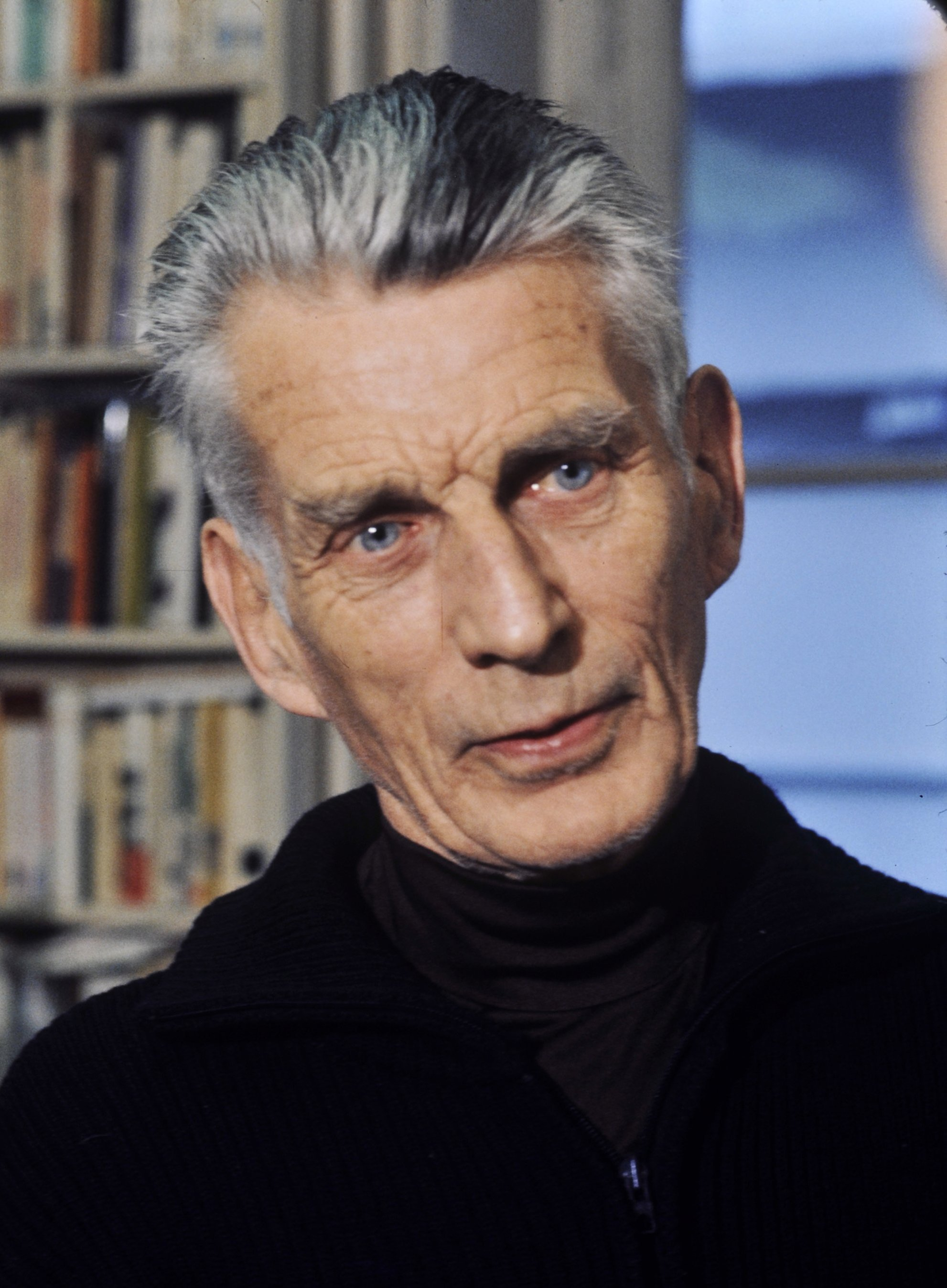
Samuel Beckett

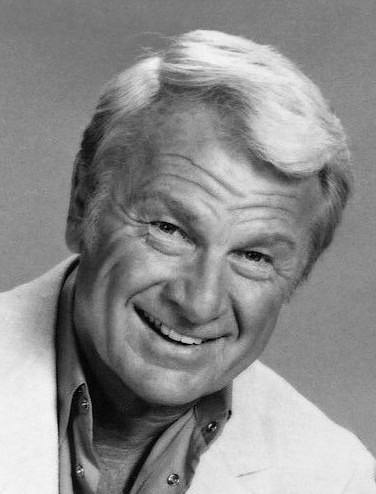
Eddie Albert

- March 1
  - Phạm Văn Đồng, Prime Minister of Vietnam (d. 2000)
  - Abdus Sattar, 8th President of Bangladesh (d. 1985)
- March 6 – Lou Costello, American actor (d. 1959)
- March 13 – Dave Kaye, British pianist (d. 1996)
- March 16 – Francisco Ayala, Spanish novelist (d. 2009)
- March 19 – Adolf Eichmann, German war criminal (executed 1962)
- March 20 – Ozzie Nelson, American actor, director and producer (d. 1975)
- March 21 – Jim Thompson, American businessman (disappeared 1967)
- March 25 – A. J. P. Taylor, English historian (d. 1990)
- March 26 – Rafael Méndez, Mexican trumpet player (d. 1981)
- March 31 – Shin'ichirō Tomonaga, Japanese physicist, Nobel Prize laureate (d. 1979)
- April 1 – Alexander Yakovlev, Russian politician, architect of perestroika (d. 1989)
- April 4 – Bea Benaderet, American actress (d. 1968)
- April 5 – Yin Shun, Chinese Buddhist master (d. 2005)
- April 6 – Virginia Hall, American spy with the Special Operations Executive during WWII (d. 1982)
- April 9 – Antal Doráti, Hungarian-born American conductor (d. 1988)
- April 13 – Samuel Beckett, Irish writer, Nobel Prize laureate (d. 1989)
- April 22 – Eddie Albert, American actor and activist (d. 2005)
- April 24 – William Joyce, Irish-American World War II Nazi propaganda broadcaster ("Lord Haw-Haw") (executed 1946)
- April 25
  - Joel Brand, Hungarian rescue worker (d. 1964)
  - William J. Brennan Jr., Associate Justice of the Supreme Court of the United States (d. 1997)
  - A. W. Haydon, American inventor (d. 1982)
- April 28
  - Tony Accardo, American gangster (d. 1992)
  - Kurt Gödel, Austrian logician, mathematician, and philosopher of mathematics (d. 1978)
- April 29 – Pedro Vargas, Mexican singer and actor (d. 1989)

=== May–June ===
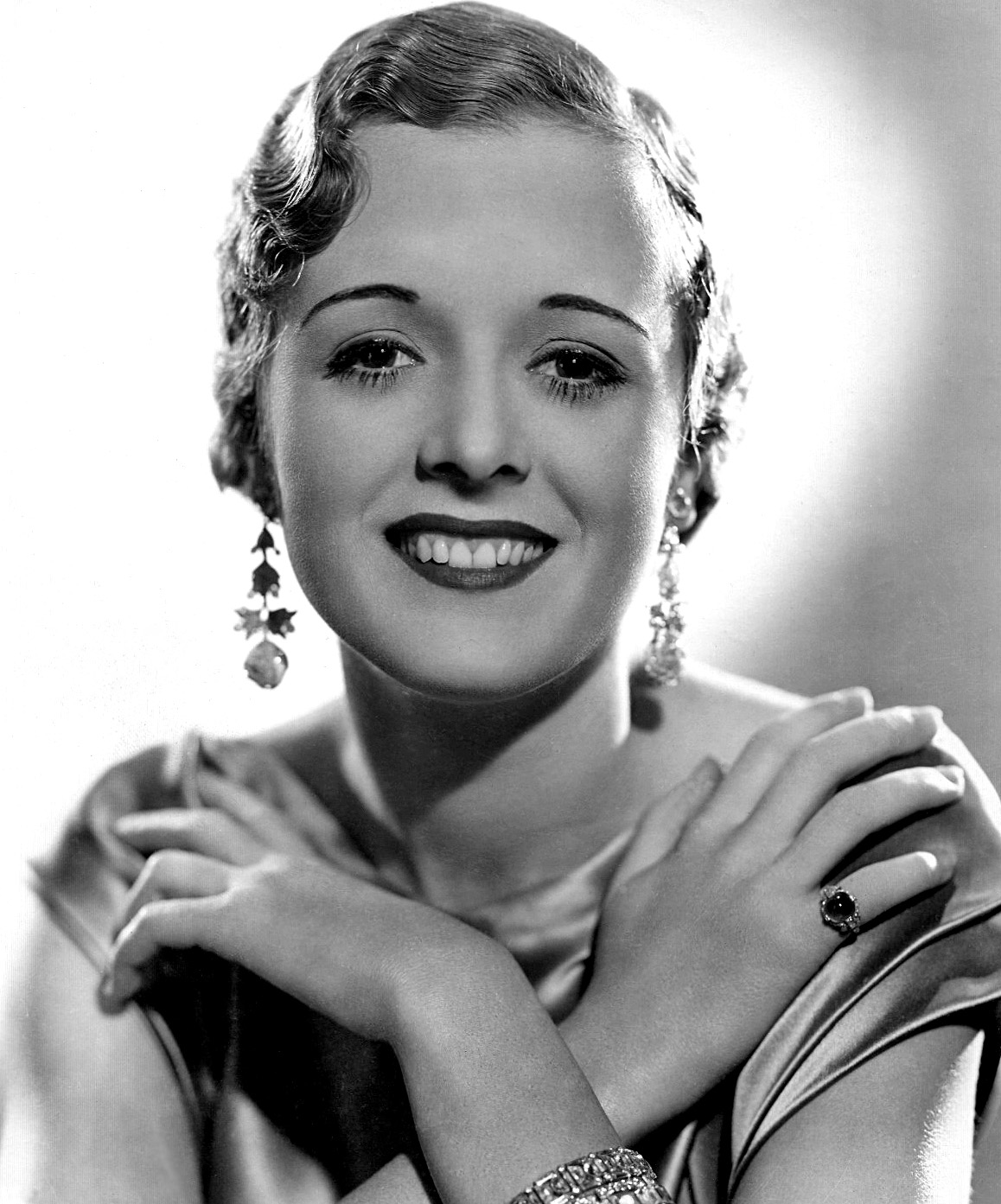
Mary Astor

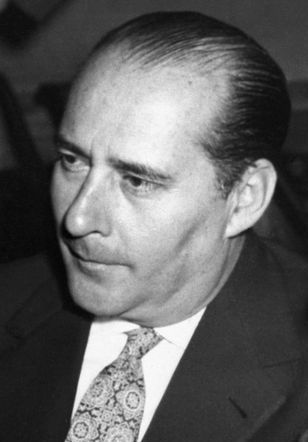
Roberto Rossellini

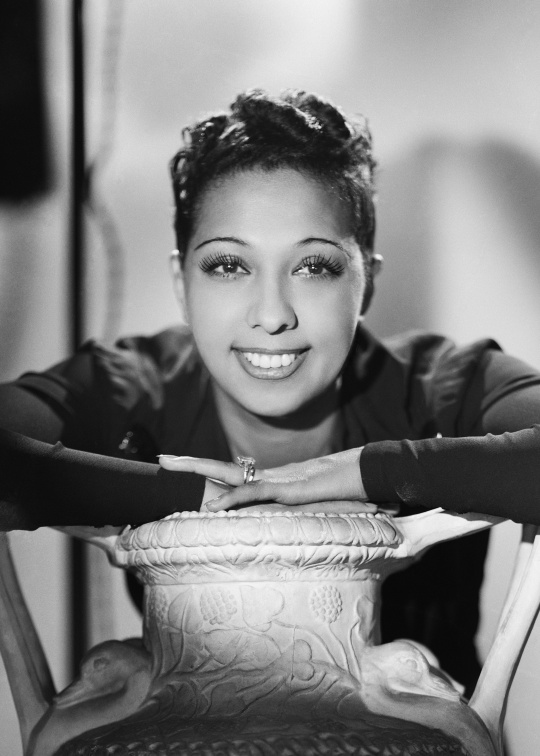
Josephine Baker

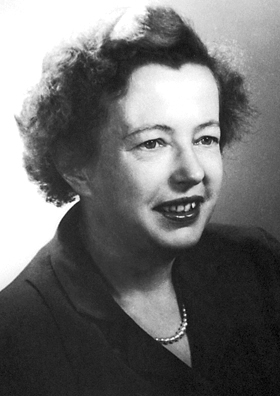
Maria Goeppert Mayer

- May 3 – Mary Astor, American actress and writer (d. 1987)
- May 6 – André Weil, French mathematician (d. 1998)
- May 8 – Roberto Rossellini, Italian director (d. 1977)
- May 11
  - Jacqueline Cochran, American aviator (d. 1980)
  - Richard Arvin Overton, oldest living man in the United States and oldest surviving American veteran (World War II) (d. 2018)
- May 15 – Humberto Delgado, Portuguese general, politician (d. 1965)
- May 16 – Arturo Uslar Pietri, Venezuelan writer (d. 2001)
- May 19
  - Bruce Bennett, American athlete, actor (d. 2007)
  - Jimmy MacDonald, Scottish-American sound effects artist, voice actor (d. 1991)
- May 20 – Giuseppe Siri, Italian Roman Catholic cardinal (d. 1989)
- May 27 – Ajahn Buddhadasa, Thai Buddhist monk (d. 1993)
- May 29 – T. H. White, British writer (d. 1964)
- June 3 – Josephine Baker, American-born French entertainer (d. 1975)
- June 6 – Max August Zorn, German-born American mathematician (d. 1993)
- June 15 – Léon Degrelle, Belgian fascist (d. 1994)
- June 17 – James H. Flatley, American admiral, aviator (d. 1958)
- June 19 – Sir Ernst Chain, German-born British biochemist, Nobel Prize laureate (d. 1979)
- June 22
  - Anne Morrow Lindbergh, American author, aviator (d. 2001)
  - Billy Wilder, Austrian-born American screenwriter, film director and producer (d. 2002)
- June 24 – Pierre Fournier, French cellist (d. 1986)
- June 26
  - Viktor Schreckengost, American industrial designer, teacher, sculptor and artist (d. 2008)
  - M. P. Sivagnanam, Indian politician (d. 1995)
- June 27 – Catherine Cookson, English author (d. 1998)
- June 28 – Maria Goeppert Mayer, German physicist, Nobel Prize laureate (d. 1972)

=== July–August ===
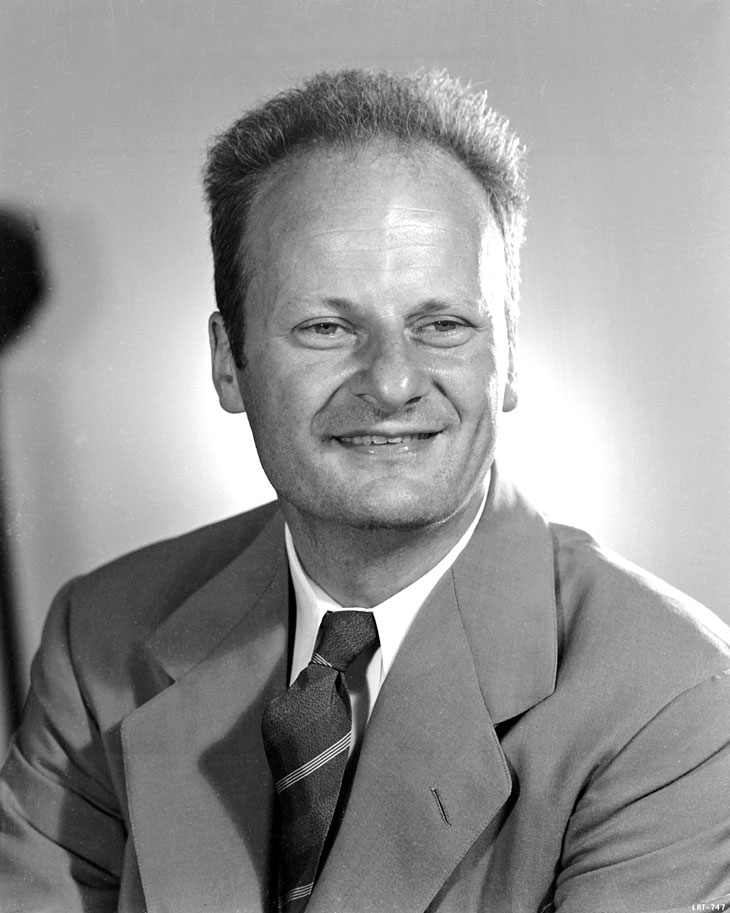
Hans Bethe

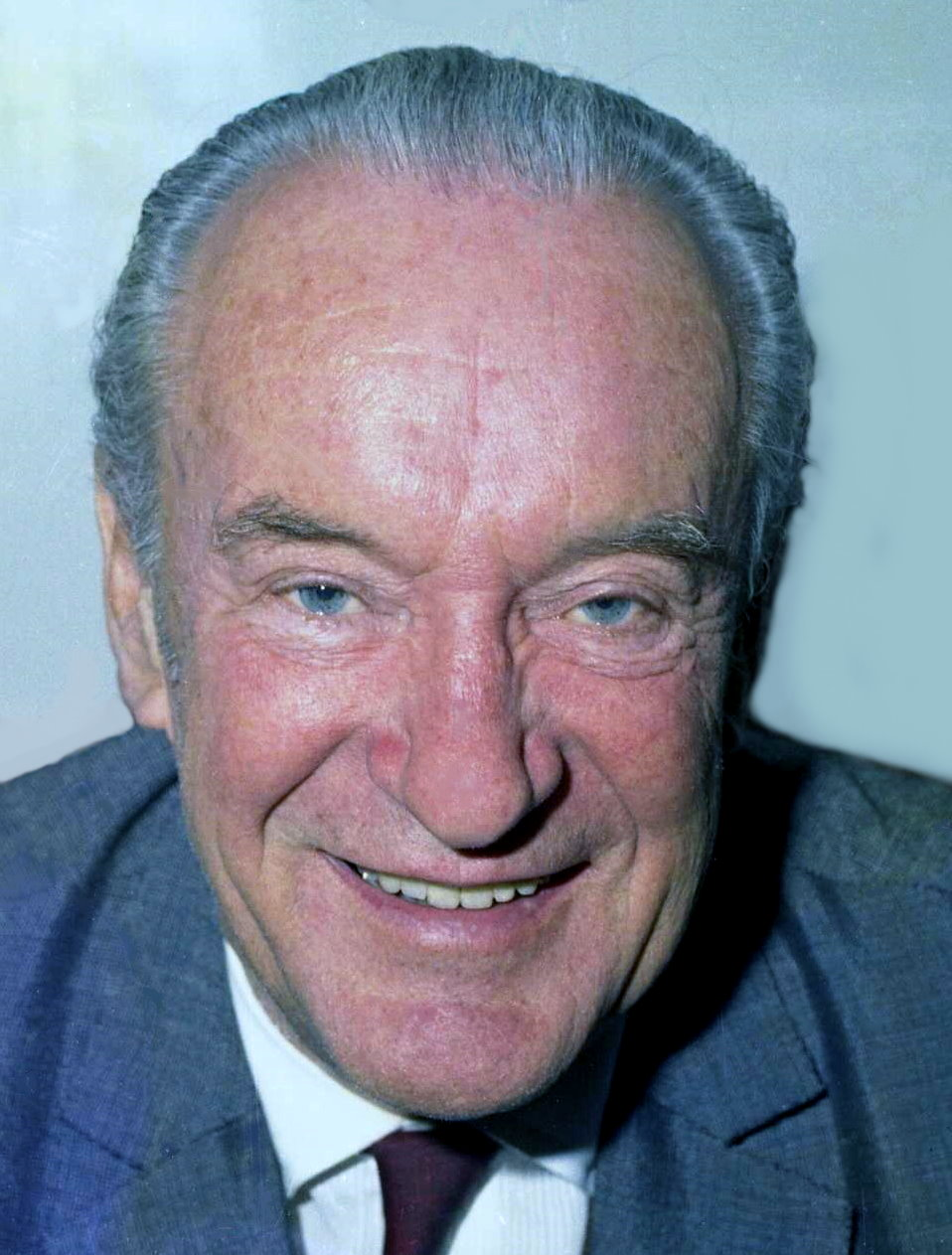
George Sanders

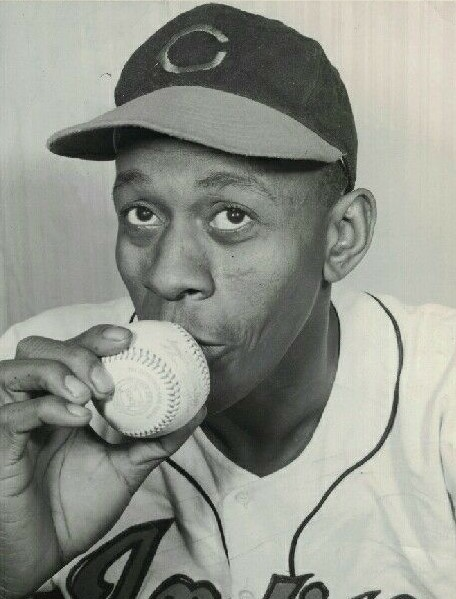
Satchel Paige

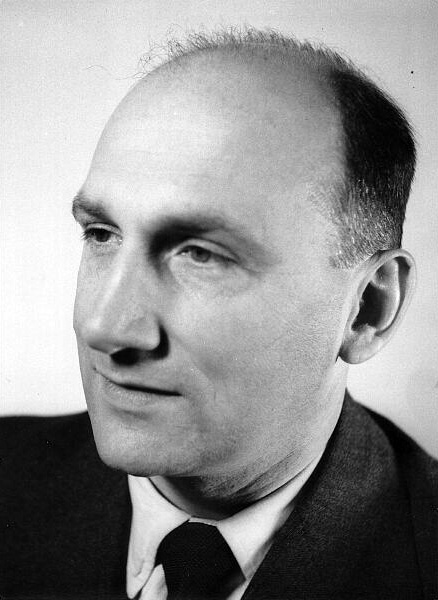
Vladimir Prelog

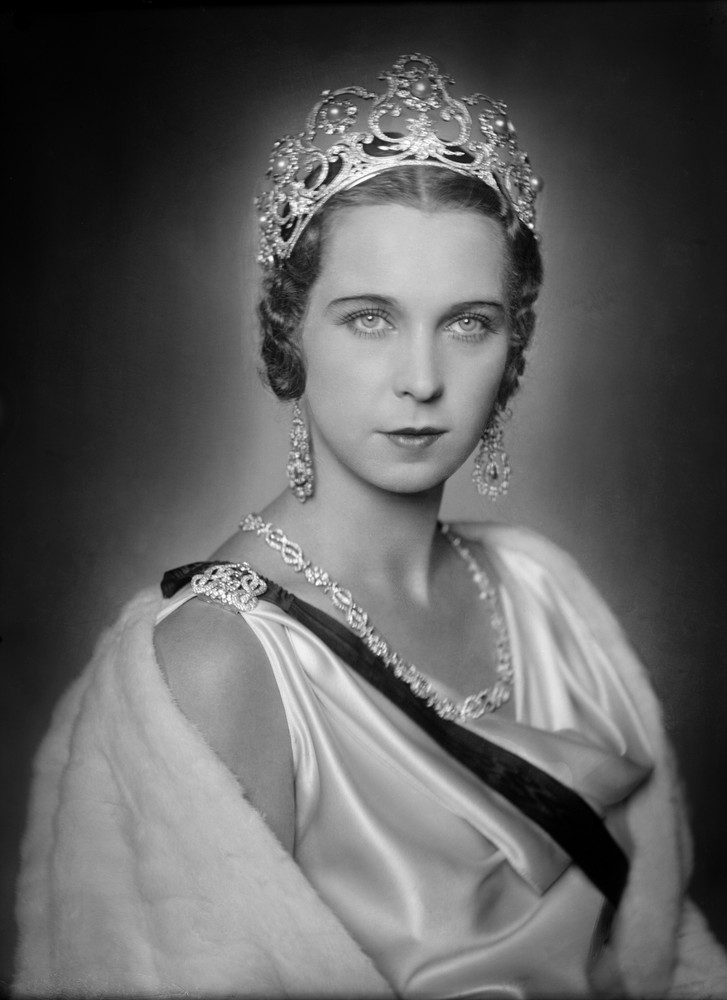
Marie-José of Belgium

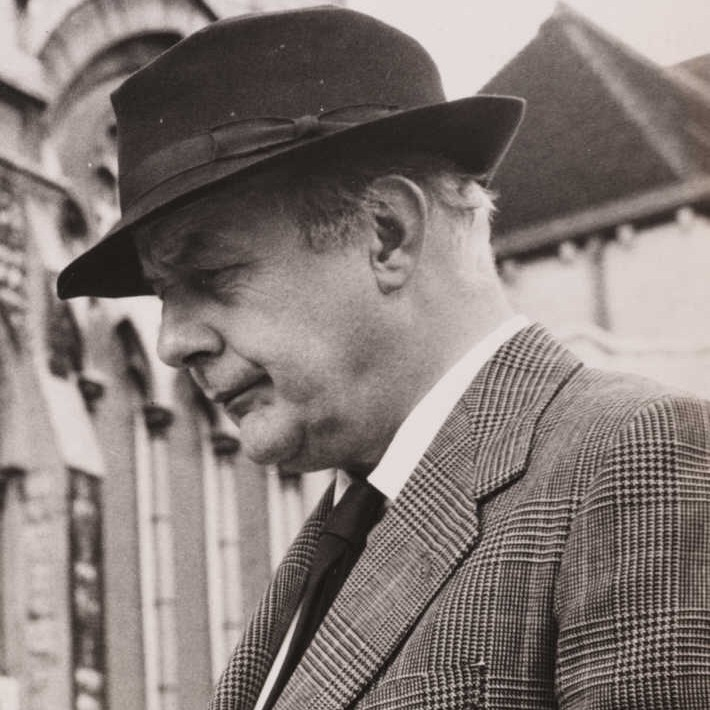
Sir John Betjeman

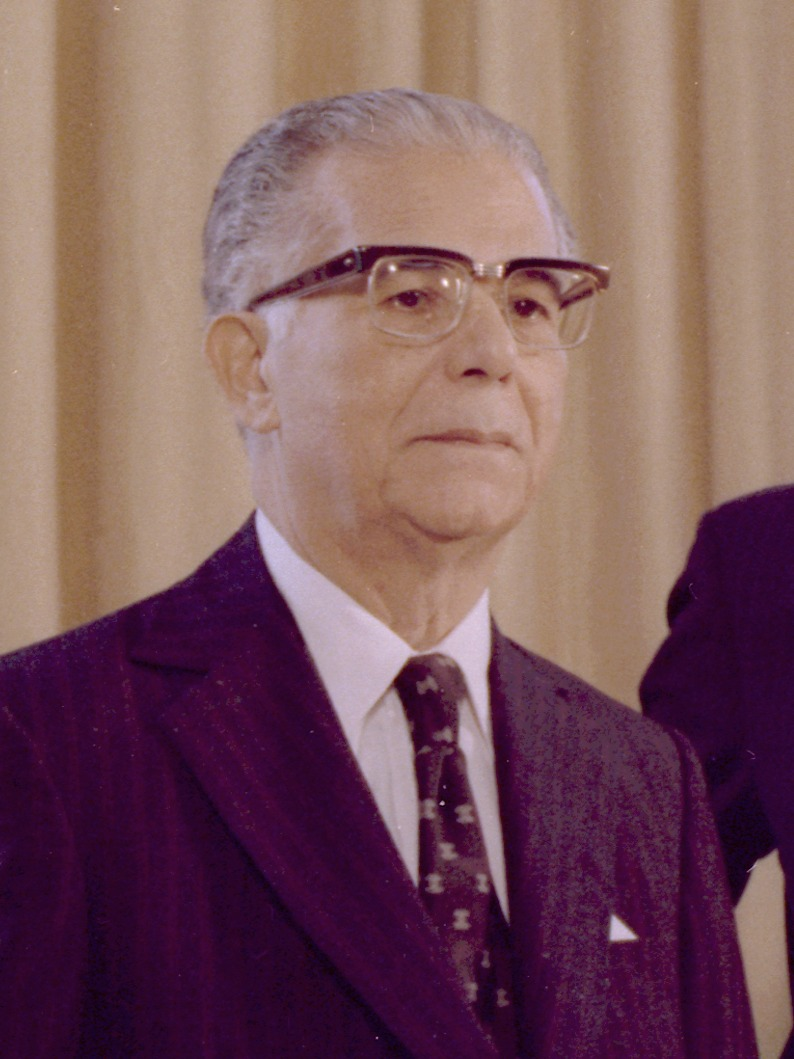
Joaquín Balaguer

- July 1
  - Jean Dieudonné, French mathematician, academic (d. 1992)
  - Estée Lauder, American cosmetics entrepreneur (d. 2004)
  - Ivan Neill, British Army officer and Irish Unionist politician (d. 2001)
- July 2
  - Hans Bethe, German-born American physicist, Nobel Prize laureate (d. 2005)
  - Károly Kárpáti, Hungarian Jewish wrestler (d. 1996)
- July 3
  - Alberto Lleras Camargo, Colombian politician, 20th President of Colombia (d. 1990)
  - George Sanders, Russian-born British actor (d. 1972)
- July 4 – Vincent Schaefer, American chemist, meteorologist (d. 1993)
- July 7
  - Helene Johnson, African-American poet (d. 1995)
  - Satchel Paige, American baseball player (d. 1982)
- July 8 – Philip Johnson, American architect (d. 2005)
- July 11 – Herbert Wehner, German politician (d. 1990)
- July 17 – Dunc Gray, Australian track cyclist (d. 1996)
- July 18 – S. I. Hayakawa, Canadian-born American academic, politician (d. 1992)
- July 21 – Caroline Smith, American diver (d. 1994)
- July 23 – Vladimir Prelog, Croatian chemist, Nobel Prize laureate (d. 1998)
- August 5
  - Joan Hickson, British actress (d. 1998)
  - John Huston, American film director, screenwriter, and actor (d. 1987)
  - Wassily Leontief, Russian economist, Nobel Prize laureate (d. 1999)
- August 5 – Marie-José of Belgium, last Queen of Italy (d. 2001)
- August 14 – Horst P. Horst, German photographer (d. 1999)
- August 17 – Marcelo Caetano, Prime Minister of Portugal (d. 1980)
- August 19 – Philo Farnsworth, American inventor (d. 1971)
- August 26 – Albert Sabin, Polish-born American medical researcher (d. 1993)
- August 27 – Ed Gein, American serial killer (d. 1984)
- August 28 – John Betjeman, English poet (d. 1984)
- August 30 – Joan Blondell, American actress (d. 1979)

=== September–October ===
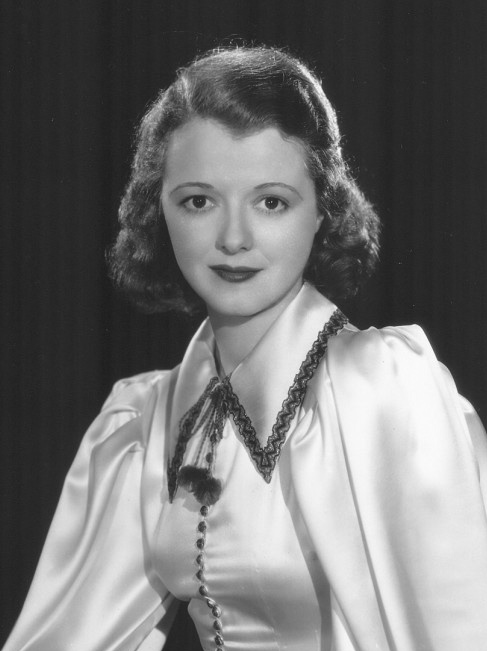
Janet Gaynor

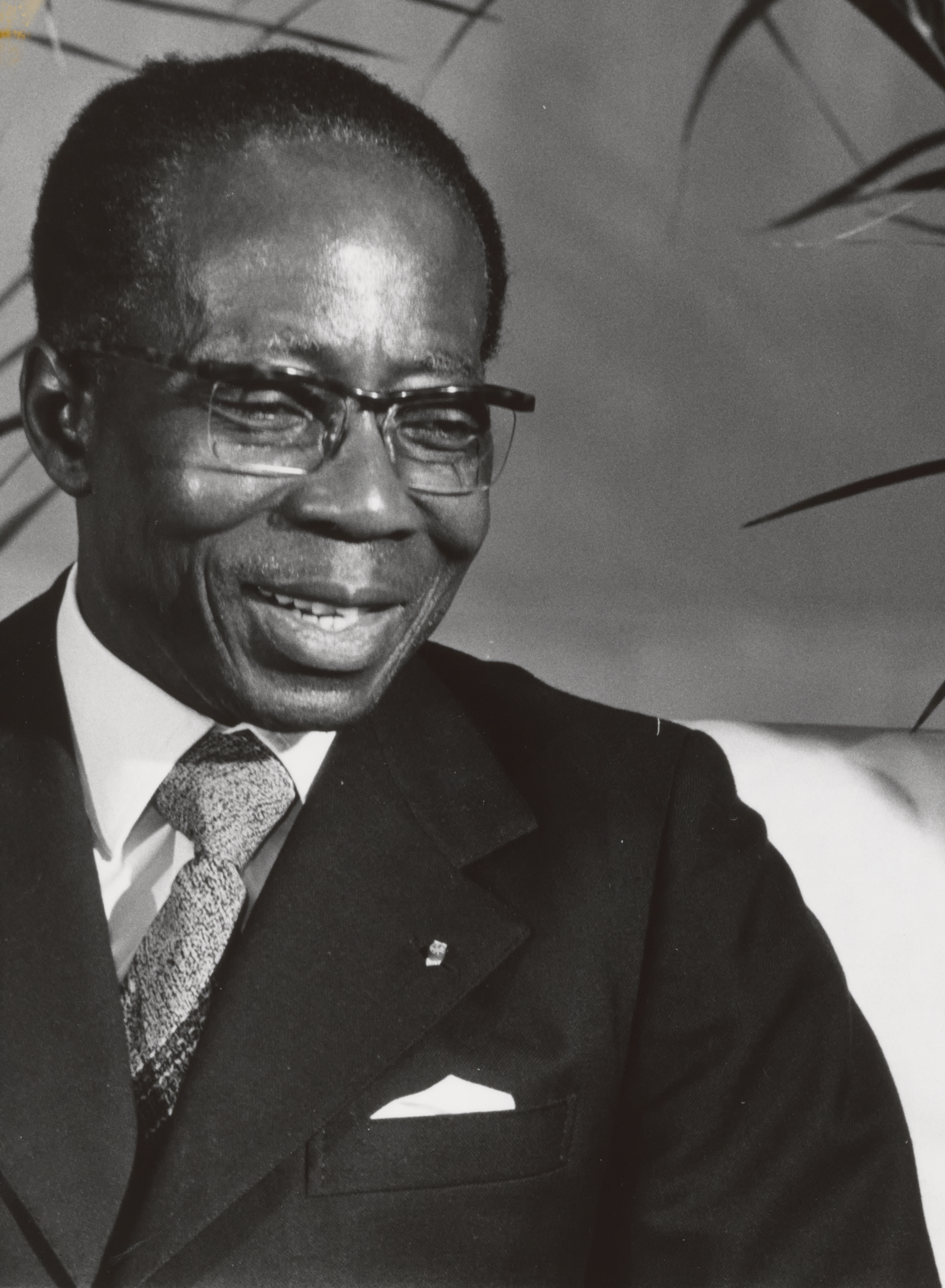
Léopold Sédar Senghor

- September 1
  - Joaquín Balaguer, 41st, 45th, & 49th President of the Dominican Republic, writer (d. 2002)
  - Eleanor Alice Burford, English writer (d. 1993)
- September 4 – Max Delbrück, German-born American biologist, Nobel Prize laureate (d. 1981)
- September 6 – Luis Federico Leloir, French-born Argentine chemist, Nobel Prize laureate (d. 1987)
- September 8 – Andrei Kirilenko, Soviet politician (d. 1990)
- September 17 – J. R. Jayewardene, President of Sri Lanka (d. 1996)
- September 26
  - José Figueres Ferrer, 32nd, 34th, & 38th President of Costa Rica (d. 1990)
  - Dmitri Shostakovich, Russian composer (d. 1975)
- September 27 – William Empson, English poet, critic (d. 1984)
- October 6 – Janet Gaynor, American Academy Award-winning actress (d. 1984)
- October 9 – Léopold Sédar Senghor, 1st President of Senegal (d. 2001)
- October 10 – R. K. Narayan, Indian novelist (d. 2001)
- October 14
  - Hassan al-Banna, Egyptian founder of the Muslim Brotherhood (d. 1949)
  - Hannah Arendt, German political theorist (d. 1975)
- October 23 – Gertrude Ederle, American swimmer (d. 2003)
- October 24 – Marie-Louise von Motesiczky, Austrian-born British painter (d. 1996)
- October 26 – Primo Carnera, Italian boxer (d. 1967)
- October 29 – Fredric Brown, American writer (d. 1972)

=== November–December ===
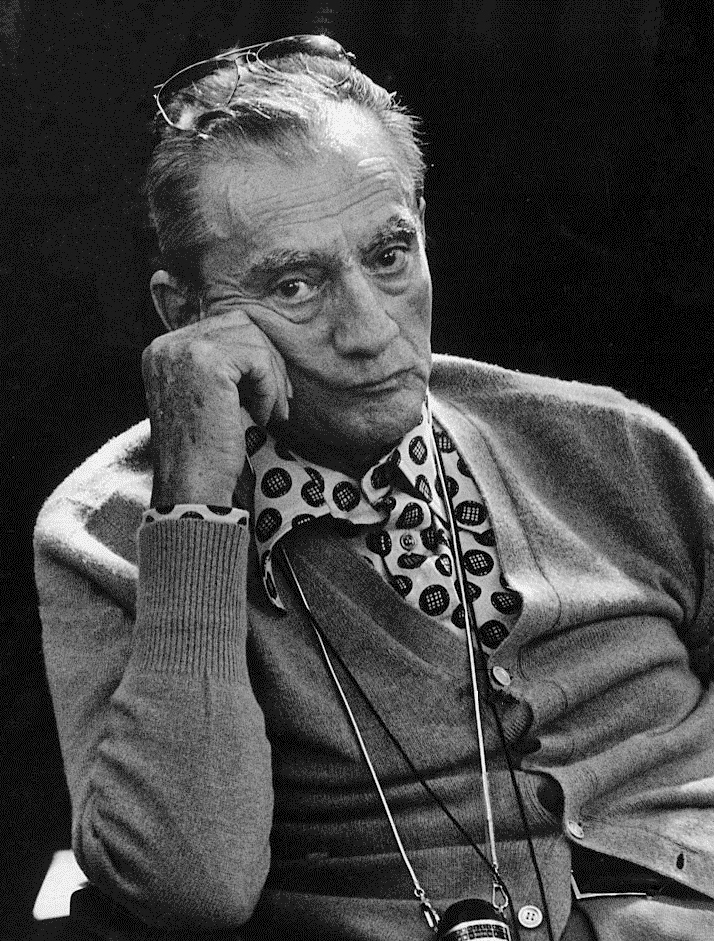
Luchino Visconti

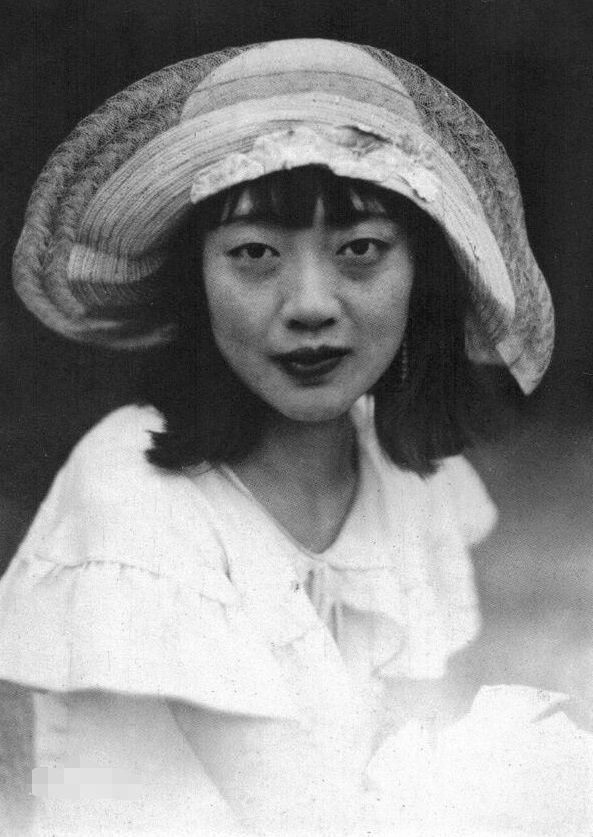
Wanrong

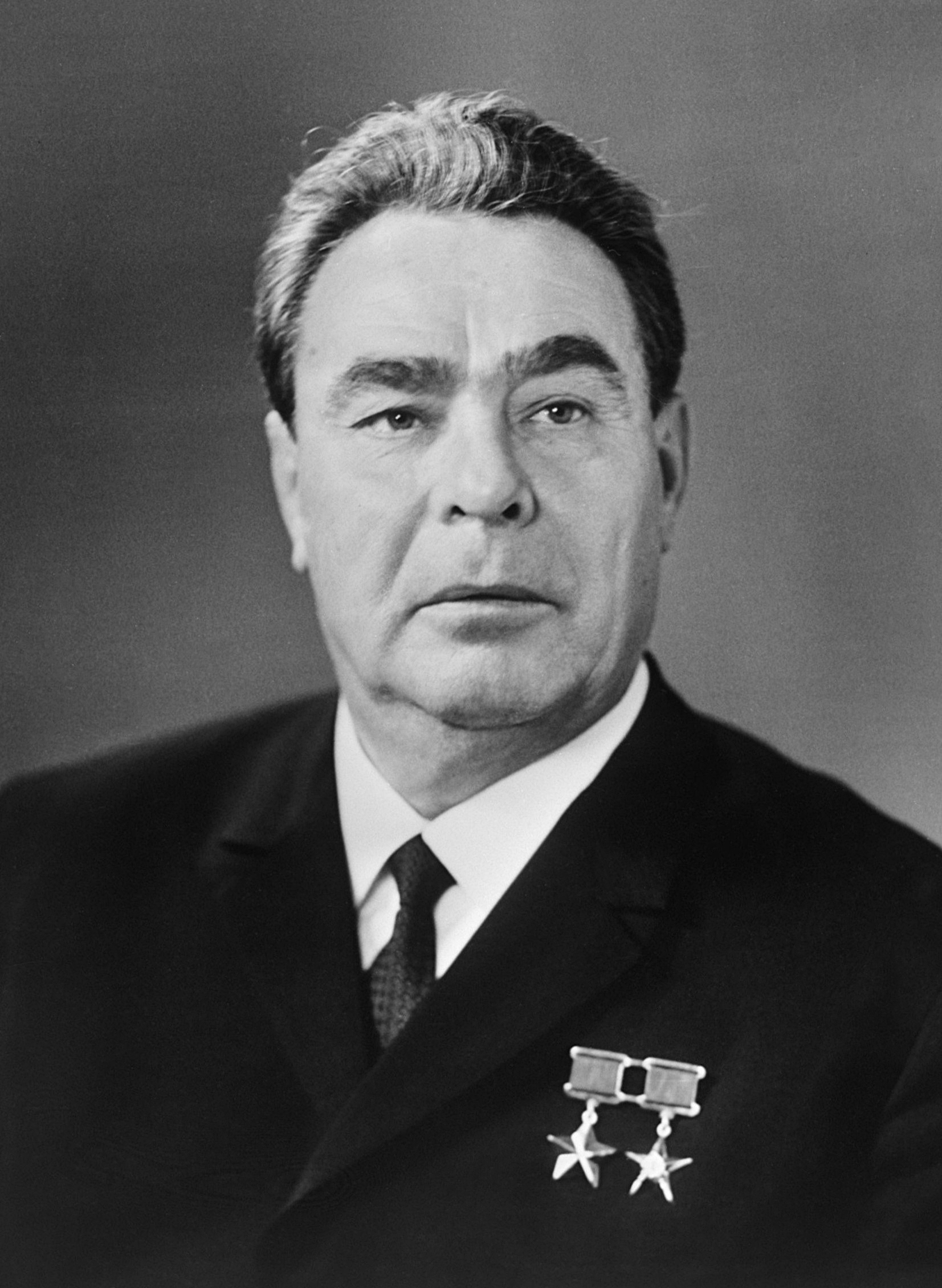
Leonid Brezhnev

- November 2
  - Ferit Melen, 14th Prime Minister of Turkey (d. 1988)
  - Luchino Visconti, Italian theatre, cinema director, writer (d. 1976)
- November 5
  - Philip Roberts, British general (d. 1997)
  - Fred Lawrence Whipple, American astronomer (d. 2004)
- November 9 – Arthur Rudolph, German rocket engineer (d. 1996)
- November 10 – Josef Kramer, German Nazi concentration camp commandant (d. 1945)
- November 13
  - Wanrong, last empress of China (d. 1946)
  - Hermione Baddeley, English character actress (d. 1986)
- November 14 – Louise Brooks, American actress (d. 1985)
- November 15 – Curtis LeMay, United States Air Force general, vice-presidential candidate (d. 1990)
- November 16 – Henri Charrière, French author (d. 1973)
- November 17 – Soichiro Honda, Japanese industrialist (d. 1991)
- November 18
  - Alec Issigonis, Greek-born British automobile designer (d. 1988)
  - Klaus Mann, German writer (d. 1949)
  - George Wald, American scientist, Nobel Prize laureate (d. 1997)
- November 22 – Jørgen Juve, Norwegian football player and journalist (d. 1983)
- December 5 – Ahn Eak-tai, Korean composer and conductor (d. 1965)
- December 9 – Grace Hopper, American computer scientist, naval officer (d. 1992)
- December 13
  - Princess Marina of Greece and Denmark (d. 1968)
  - Laurens van der Post, South African author, journalist (d. 1996)
- December 19 – Leonid Brezhnev, Soviet leader (d. 1982)
- December 24 – James Hadley Chase, English writer (d. 1985)
- December 25 – Ernst Ruska, German physicist, Nobel Prize laureate (d. 1988)
- December 27 – Oscar Levant, American pianist, composer, author, comedian, and actor (d. 1972)
- December 30 – Carol Reed, English film director (d. 1976)

== Deaths ==
=== January–June ===
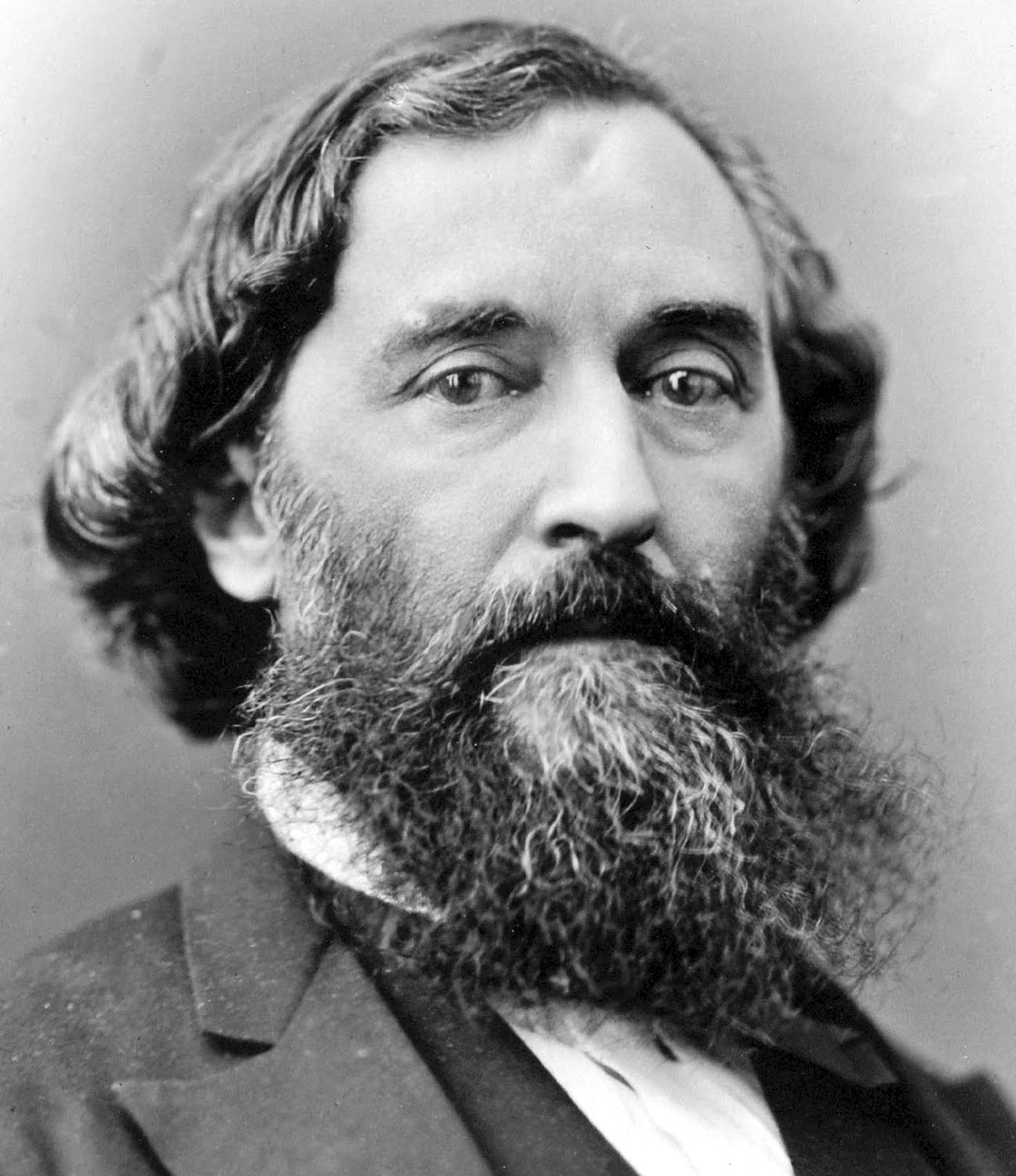
Bartolomé Mitre

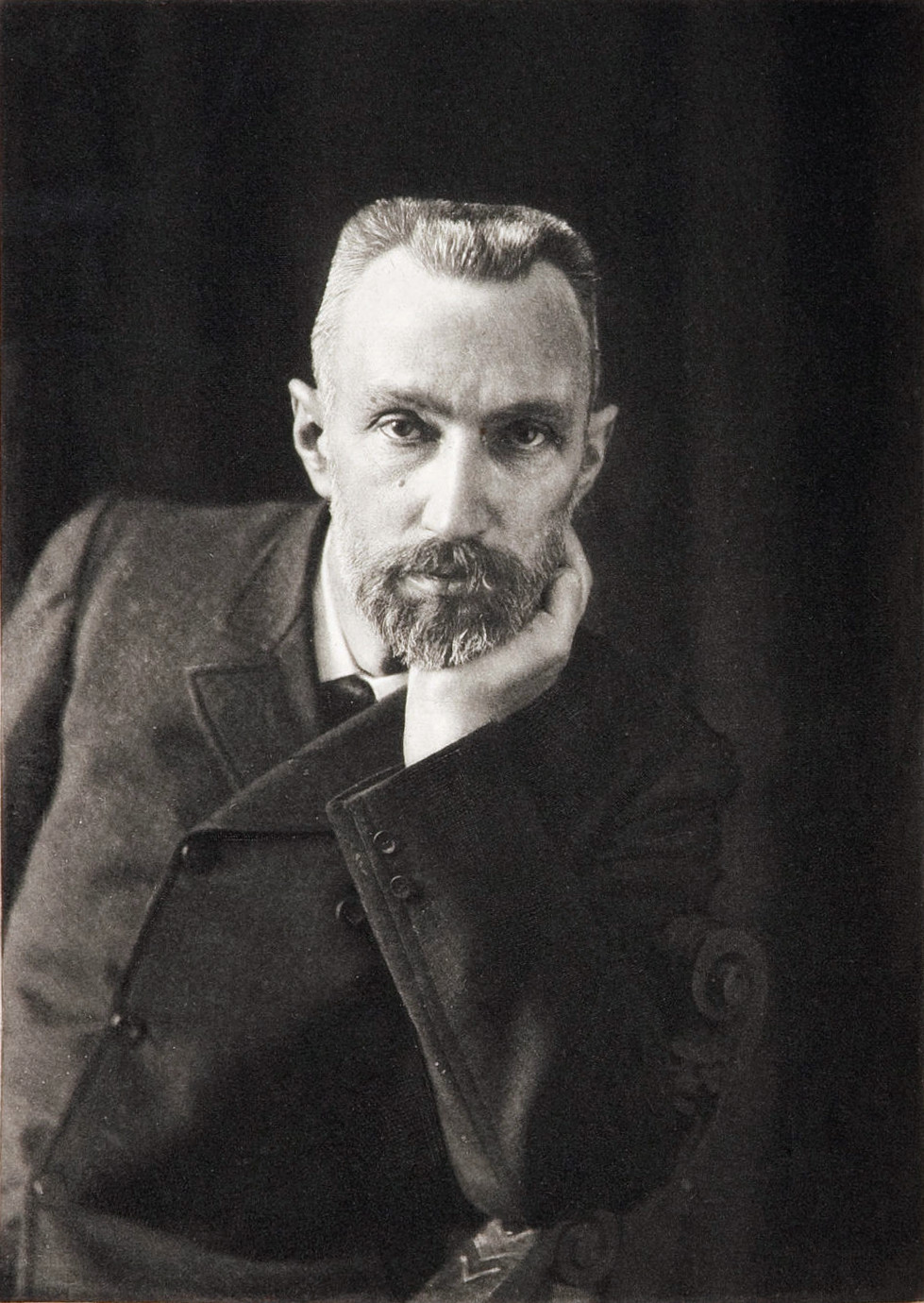
Pierre Curie

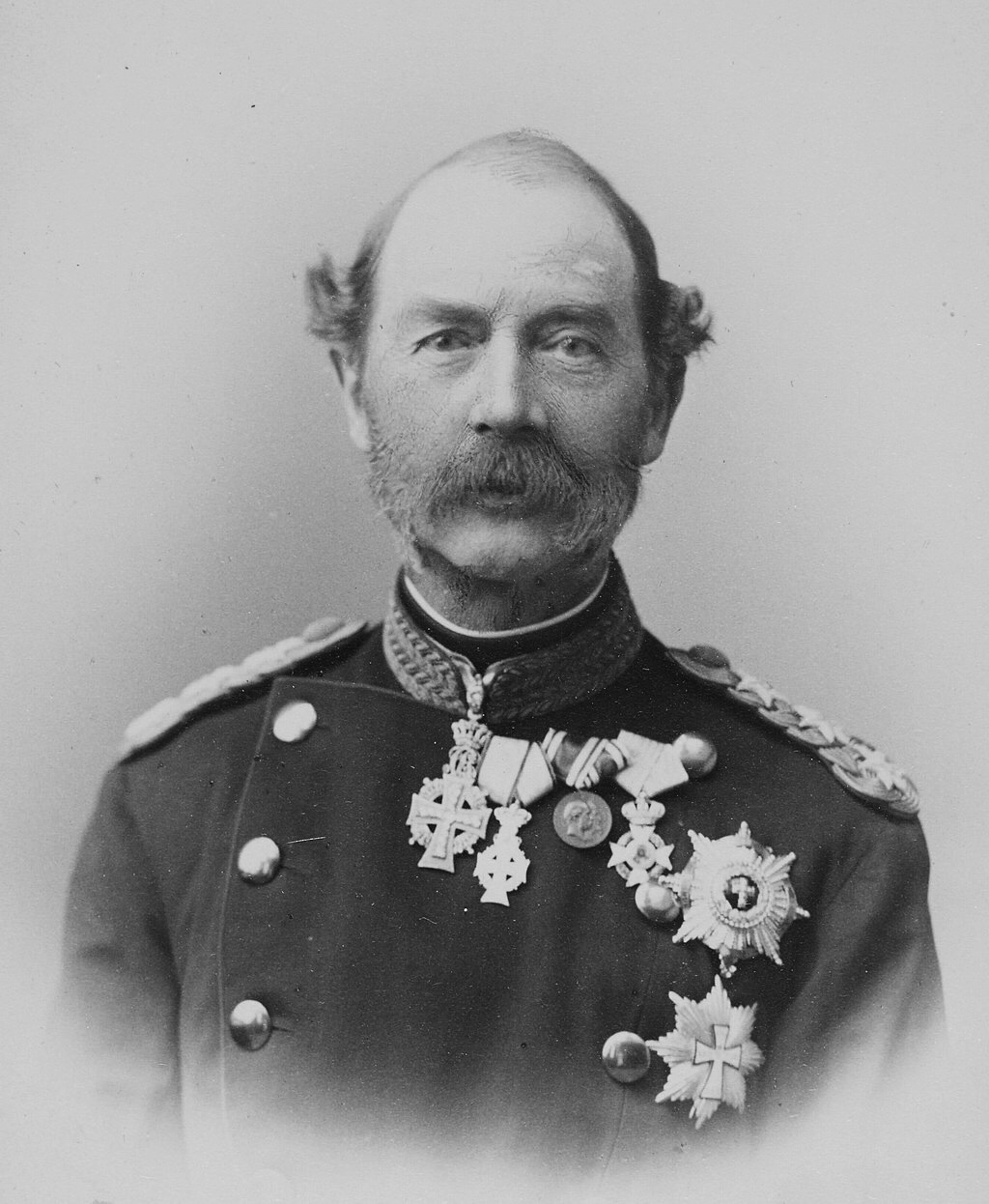
Christian IX, King of Denmark

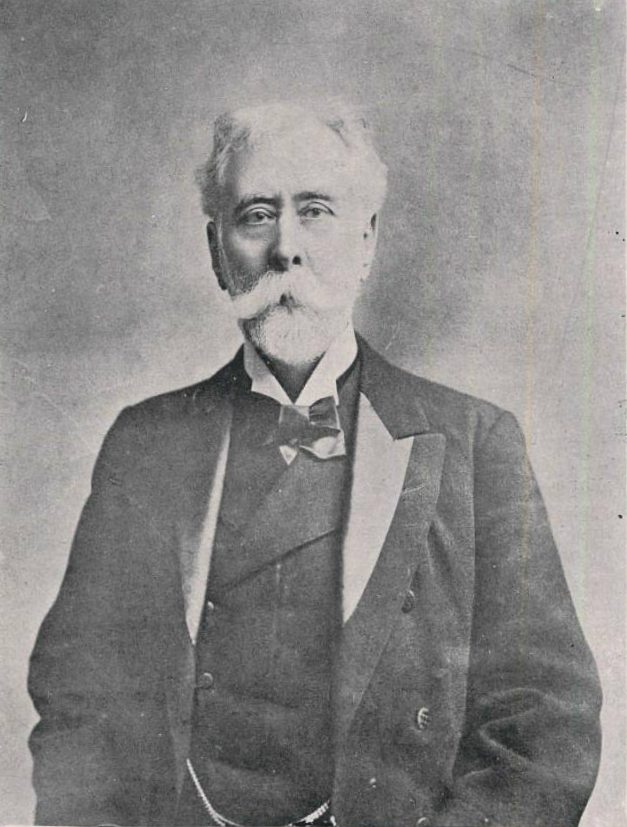
Manuel Quintana

- January 1 – Todor Ivanchov, 11th Prime Minister of Bulgaria (b. 1858)
- January 13 – Alexander Stepanovich Popov, Russian physicist (b. 1859)
- January 18 – Sir William Forbes Gatacre, British general (b. 1843)
- January 19 – Bartolomé Mitre, Argentine statesman, military figure and author, 6th President of Argentina (b. 1821)
- January 20 – Maria Cristina of the Immaculate Conception Brando, Italian Roman Catholic nun, saint (b. 1856)
- January 25 – Joseph Wheeler, American general, politician (b. 1836)
- January 29 – King Christian IX of Denmark (b. 1818)
- February 8 – Giuseppina Gabriella Bonino, Italian Roman Catholic religious professed (b. 1843)
- February 9 – Paul Laurence Dunbar, American poet and publisher (b. 1872)
- February 13 – Albert Gottschalk, Danish painter (b. 1866)
- February 18 – John B. Stetson, American hat maker (b. 1830)
- February 26 – Jean Lanfray, Swiss convicted murderer (b. 1874)
- February 27 – Samuel Langley, American astronomer, physicist, and aeronautics pioneer (b. 1834)
- March 1 – José María de Pereda, Spanish writer (b. 1833)
- March 4 – John Schofield, American general (b. 1831)
- March 8 – Henry Baker Tristram, English clergyman, ornithologist (b. 1822)
- March 12 – Manuel Quintana, 15th President of Argentina (b. 1835)
- March 13
  - Susan B. Anthony, American civil rights, women's suffrage activist (b. 1820)
  - Joseph Monier, French gardener, inventor (b. 1823)
- March 17 – Johann Most, German-American anarchist (b. 1846)
- March 19 – Victor Fatio, Swiss zoologist (b. 1838)
- March 20 – Adeline Dutton Train Whitney, American author of juvenile literature for girls (b. 1824)
- March 23 – Thomas Lake Harris, American poet (b. 1823)
- March 29
  - Slava Raškaj, Croatian painter (b. 1877)
  - Albert Sorel, French historian (b. 1842)
- April 6 – Alexander Kielland, Norwegian author (b. 1849)
- April 19
  - Pierre Curie, French physicist, Nobel Prize laureate, in road accident (b. 1859)
  - Spencer Gore, British tennis player, cricketer (b. 1850)
- April 25 – John Knowles Paine, American composer (b. 1839)
- April 30 – Clitus Barbour, American attorney and congressman (b. 1837)
- May 10 – Hashim Jalilul Alam Aqamaddin, Sultan of Brunei (b. 1825)
- May 14 – Carl Schurz, German revolutionary, American statesman (b. 1829)
- May 23 – Henrik Ibsen, Norwegian playwright (b. 1828)
- June 5 – Eduard von Hartmann, German philosopher (b. 1842)
- June 10 – Richard Seddon, 15th Prime Minister of New Zealand (b. 1845)
- June 17 – Harry Nelson Pillsbury, American chess champion (b. 1872)
- June 25 – Stanford White, American architect (b. 1853)

=== July–December ===
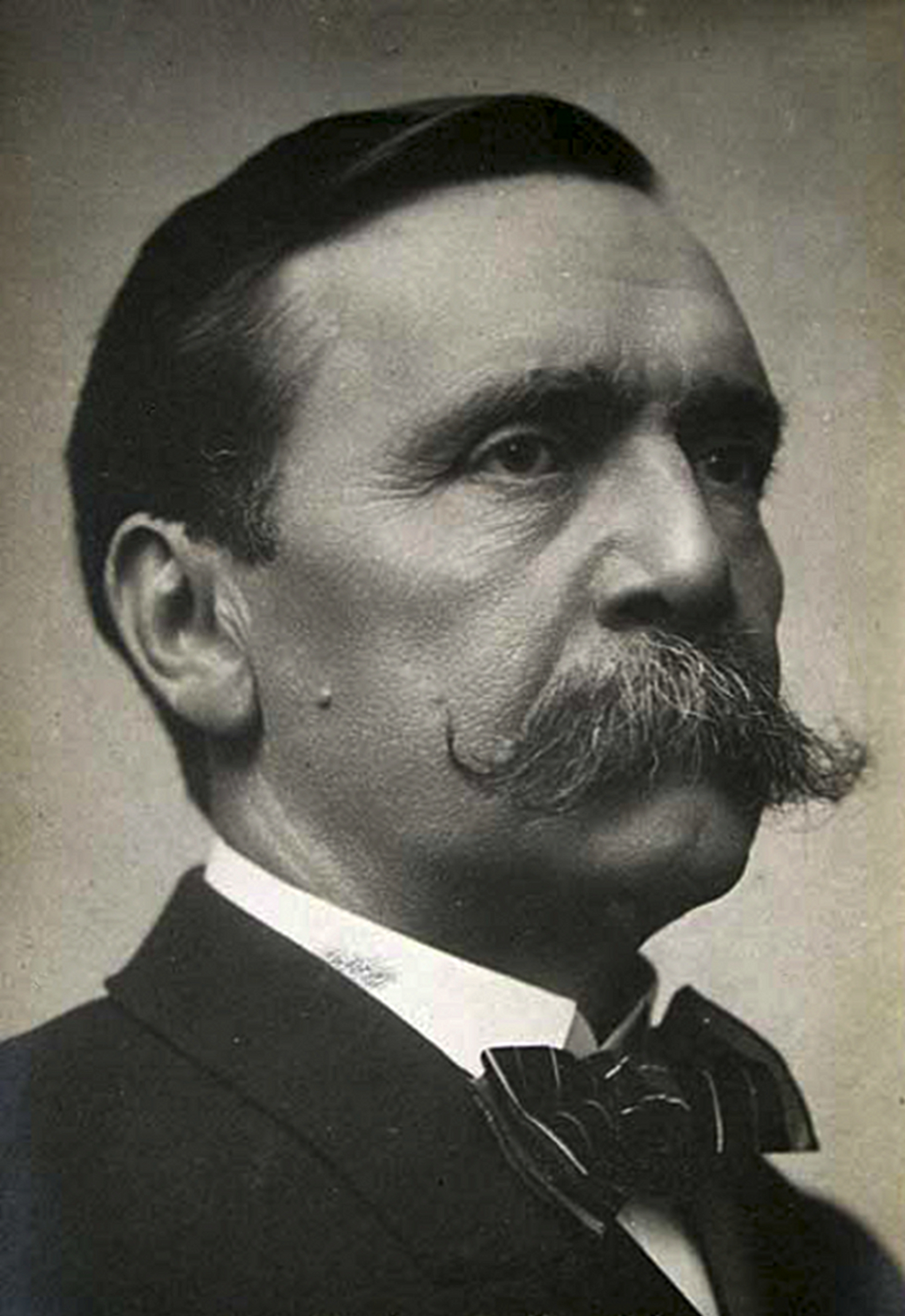
Carlos Pellegrini

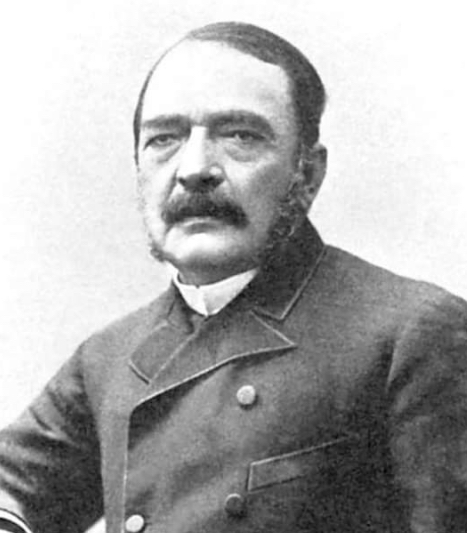
Aniceto Arce

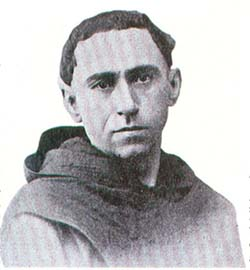
Saint Ezequiél Moreno y Díaz

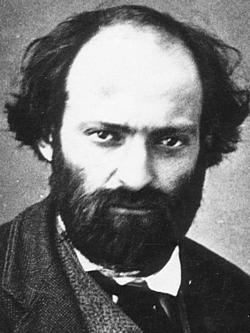
Paul Cézanne

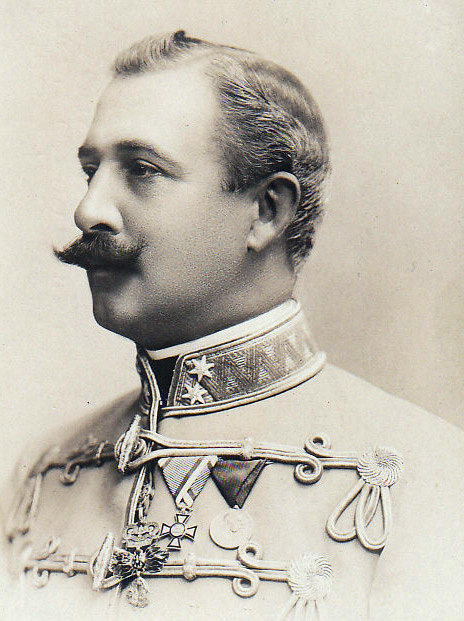
Archduke Otto of Austria

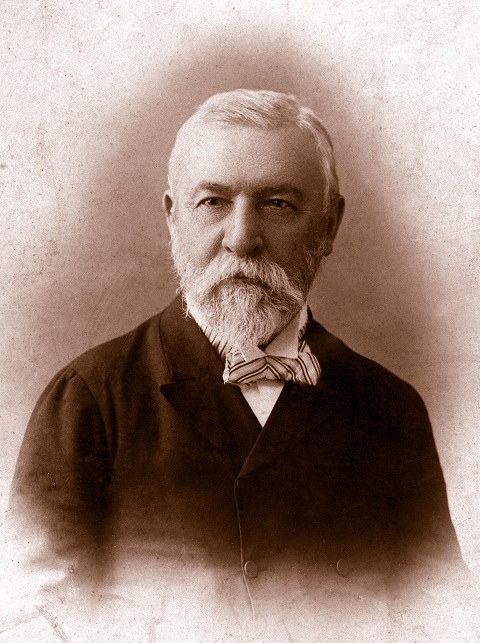
Todor Burmov

- July 1 – Manuel García, Spanish opera singer, music educator and vocal pedagogue (b. 1805)
- July 11 – Grace Brown, American murder/and or drowning victim (b. 1886)
- July 17 – Carlos Pellegrini, 11th President of Argentina (b. 1846)
- August 6 – George Waterhouse, 7th Prime Minister of New Zealand (b. 1824)
- August 14 – Aniceto Arce, 27th President of Bolivia (b. 1824)
- August 19 – Ezequiél Moreno y Díaz, Colombian Roman Catholic priest, saint (b. 1848)
- September 1 – Giuseppe Giacosa, Italian poet, librettist (b. 1847)
- September 5 – Ludwig Boltzmann, Austrian physicist (b. 1854)
- September 13 – Emily Pitts Stevens, American school founder (b. 1841)
- September 23 – August Bondeson, Swedish author (b. 1844)
- October 9 – Adelaide Ristori, Italian actress (b. 1822)
- October 16 – Varina Davis, First Lady of the Confederate States of America (b. 1826)
- October 19
  - Arthur von Mohrenheim, Russian diplomat (b. 1824)
  - Charles Pfizer, German-American chemist, co-founder of Pfizer (b. 1824)
- October 22 – Paul Cézanne, French painter (b. 1839)
- October 23 – Vladimir Stasov, Russian music critic (b. 1824)
- October 30 – Gathorne Gathorne-Hardy, 1st Earl of Cranbrook, British politician (b. 1814)
- November 1 – Archduke Otto of Austria (b. 1865)
- November 7 – Todor Burmov, 1st Prime Minister of Bulgaria (b. 1834)
- November 9 – Saint Elizabeth of the Trinity, French Discalced Carmelite religious professed and saint (b. 1880)
- November 12 – William Rufus Shafter, American general (b. 1835)
- November 16 – Mother Veronica of the Passion, Ottoman-born religious leader (b. 1823)
- November 19, – Georgia Cayvan, American stage actress (b. 1857)
- November 28 – Jennie Yeamans, Australian-born American actress (b. 1862)
- November 30
  - Sir Edward Reed, British naval architect, author, politician, and railroad magnate (b. 1830)
  - John Ward (geologist), English palaeontologist (b. 1837)
- December 7 – Élie Ducommun, Swiss journalist and activist, Nobel Prize laureate (b. 1833)
- December 8 – Sylvia Gerrish, American musical theatre star (b. 1860)
- December 13 – Jan Gerard Palm, Dutch composer (b. 1831)
- December 21 – Rajendrasuri, Indian religious reformer (b. 1827)
- December 30 – Josephine Butler, British feminist, social reformer (b. 1828)

== Nobel Prizes ==

- Physics – J. J. Thomson
- Chemistry – Henri Moissan
- Medicine – Camillo Golgi and Santiago Ramón y Cajal
- Literature – Giosuè Carducci
- Peace – Theodore Roosevelt

== Sources ==
- The Annual Register of World Events: A Review of the Year: 1906. Longmans, Green. 1907., comprehensive guide to political events worldwide; emphasis on Britain
