= William Hawkins Abbott =

American businessman (1819–1901)

William Hawkins Abbott (October 27, 1819 – January 8, 1901) was a producer of petroleum who also built the first oil refinery. He was also engaged in a variety of other business activities.

Abbott was born in Middlebury, Connecticut, and became a clerk in the general store in Watertown, Connecticut, circa 1837 to 1844. He entered the general merchandise business himself in 1845, and married Jane Wheeler in September of that same year. He continued in the mercantile business, becoming interested in the petroleum business later on. He was one of the first people involved in the oil trade, and the refinery he built in Titusville, Pennsylvania in 1861 was the first petroleum refinery. In 1862 he moved to Titusville himself, and there established the first retail coal business. He also established the first oil pipeline consolidation and revived interest in the Union & Titusville Railroad Co, which he reopened in 1871. He also served as the president of the 1st National Bank of Titusville.
