= Timex Building (2001) =

Coordinates: 41°30′50″N 73°08′57″W

The Timex Building, also known as Watch Hill, is the former headquarters of the American watch manufacturer Timex Group USA located at 555 Christian Road in Middlebury, Connecticut.

The building was built in 2001 to serve as the world headquarters for Timex Corporation. The building is 81,000 square feet and cost $23 million in 2001.

The building is sited in a secluded field on a hill, and has been described as "an architectural wonder."

Recently, Timex has vacated the space and the building has been threatened with demolition.
