= Middlebury, Connecticut =

- Town
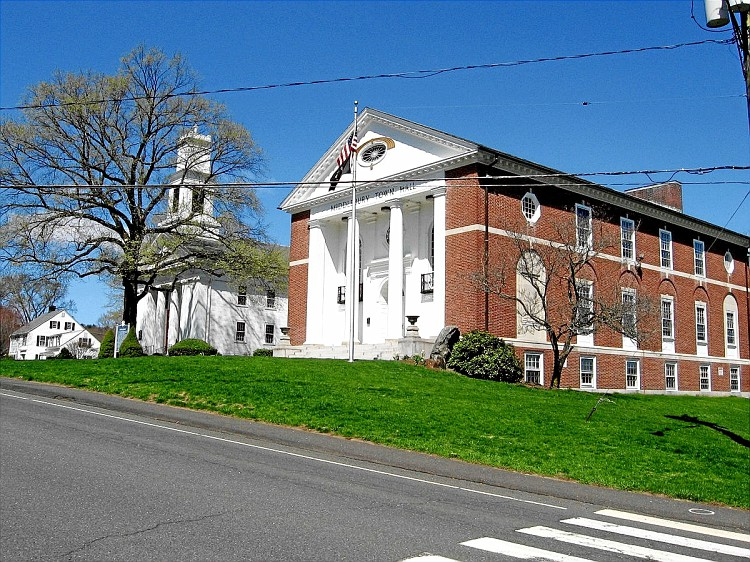
- Middlebury Town Hall

- Seal
- Interactive map of Middlebury, Connecticut
- Coordinates: 41°31′39″N 73°07′24″W
- Country: United States
- U.S. state: Connecticut
- County: New Haven
- Region: Naugatuck Valley
- Incorporated: 1807

Government
  - Type: Selectman-town meeting
  - First selectman: Jennifer Mahr (U)
  - Selectman: J. Paul Vance (D)
  - Selectman: Brian Shaban (R)

Area
  - Total: 18.5 sq mi (47.9 km^{2})
  - Land: 17.8 sq mi (46.0 km^{2})
  - Water: 0.69 sq mi (1.8 km^{2})
- Elevation: 712 ft (217 m)

Population (2020)
  - Total: 7,574
  - Density: 426/sq mi (165/km^{2})
- Demonym: Middleburian
- Time zone: UTC-5 (Eastern)
  - Summer (DST): UTC-4 (Eastern)
- ZIP code: 06762
- Area codes: 203/475
- FIPS code: 09-46940
- GNIS feature ID: 0213459
- Website: www.middlebury-ct.org

Middlebury is a town in New Haven County, Connecticut, United States. The population was 7,574 at the 2020 census. The town is part of the Naugatuck Valley Planning Region. It is a suburb of the nearby city of Waterbury to its south, and is on the northern fringe of the New York metropolitan area.

== History ==
Middlebury was incorporated as a town in 1807, and named from its central position relative to Waterbury, Woodbury, and Southbury.

== Geography ==
According to the United States Census Bureau, the town has a total area of 18.5 square miles (48 km^{2}), of which 17.8 square miles (46 km^{2}) is land and 0.7 square miles (1.8 km^{2}), or 3.79%, is water.

Towns that border Middlebury are Southbury, Woodbury, Watertown, Waterbury, Naugatuck and Oxford.

== Demographics ==
Historical population
Census	Pop.	Note	%±
1820	838		—
1850	763		—
1860	664		−13.0%
1870	696		4.8%
1880	687		−1.3%
1890	566		−17.6%
1900	736		30.0%
1910	836		13.6%
1920	1,067		27.6%
1930	1,449		35.8%
1940	2,173		50.0%
1950	3,318		52.7%
1960	4,785		44.2%
1970	5,542		15.8%
1980	5,995		8.2%
1990	6,145		2.5%
2000	6,451		5.0%
2010	7,575		17.4%
2020	7,574		0.0%
U.S. Decennial Census

As of the census of 2000, there were 6,451 people, 2,398 households, and 1,832 families living in the town. The population density was 363.4 inhabitants per square mile (140.3/km^{2}). There were 2,494 housing units at an average density of 140.5 per square mile (54.2/km^{2}). The racial makeup of the town was 97.12% White, 0.36% African American, 0.06% Native American, 1.30% Asian, 0.03% Pacific Islander, 0.26% from other races, and 0.87% from two or more races. Hispanic or Latino of any race were 1.22% of the population.

There were 2,398 households, out of which 33.1% had children under the age of 18 living with them, 67.3% were married couples living together, 6.3% had a female householder with no husband present, and 23.6% were non-families. 20.1% of all households were made up of individuals, and 11.9% had someone living alone who was 65 years of age or older. The average household size was 2.66 and the average family size was 3.09.

In the town, the population was spread out, with 24.5% under the age of 18, 4.2% from 18 to 24, 25.3% from 25 to 44, 29.4% from 45 to 64, and 16.5% who were 65 years of age or older. The median age was 43 years. For every 100 females, there were 94.1 males. For every 100 females age 18 and over, there were 91.0 males.

The median income for a household in the town was $70,469, and the median income for a family was $81,370. Males had a median income of $51,925 versus $37,104 for females. The per capita income for the town was $33,056. About 2.3% of families and 2.7% of the population were below the poverty line, including 2.8% of those under age 18 and 3.9% of those age 65 or over.

As of 2010, it is estimated that there are 7,575 (+17.4% from 2000) people in Middlebury. From 2000 to 2021, the estimated median income has risen to $108,653 (+54.2%). The estimated median home & condo value has risen to $321,100 (+94%).

== Arts and culture ==
Notable sites:

- Josiah Bronson House, built in 1738 and listed on the National Register of Historic Places in 1982
- Quassy Amusement Park, (1908–present), one of the nation's oldest amusement parks in continuous operation
- Timex Building (2001), former headquarters of Timex Group USA.

== Government ==
=== State and federal elected officials ===
U.S. Congress:

- U.S. Senators: Chris Murphy, Richard Blumenthal
- U.S. Congressman: Jahana Hayes

Connecticut General Assembly:

- State Senators: Joan Hartley (15), Eric Berthel (32)
- State Representative: Bill Pizzuto (71)

=== Registration and voting statistics ===
Voter registration and party enrollment as of November 1, 2022
Party	Active voters	Inactive voters	Total voters	Percentage
Republican	2,342	97	2,439	37.51%
Democratic	1,464	65	1,529	23.52%
Unaffiliated	2,282	147	2,429	37.36%
Minor Parties	98	6	104	1.60%
Total	6,186	315	6,501	100%

Middlebury town vote by party in presidential elections
Year	Democratic	Republican	Third Parties
2024	43.12% 2,209	55.06% 2,820	1.82% 93
2020	44.52% 2,259	54.02% 2,741	1.46% 74
2016	37.09% 1,664	58.61% 2,630	4.30% 193
2012	36.99% 1,586	62.17% 2,666	0.84% 36
2008	42.97% 1,905	55.67% 2,468	1.36% 60

== Local media ==
- Waterbury Republican-American – A Waterbury-based independent daily newspaper.
- Voices – A Southbury-based newspaper serving Middlebury, Oxford, Southbury, Seymour, Naugatuck, Woodbury, Bethlehem, New Preston, Washington, Washington Depot, Roxbury, Bridgewater, Monroe, Sandy Hook, and Newtown
- Middlebury Bee-Intelligencer – A Middlebury-based independent newspaper.

== Notable people ==
- William Hawkins Abbott (1819–1901), born in Middlebury, pioneering petroleum refiner and businessman
- Shane Bannon (1989–present), Former NFL Running Back
- Mike Borkowski (1973–present), professional race car driver
- Naum Gabo (1890–1977), world-famous modernist sculptor, the founder of Constructivism in Moscow in 1919, lived in Middlebury beginning in 1953
- Grant Goodeve (1952–present), actor
- A. W. Haydon (1906–1982), American inventor lived in Middlebury from 1965 to his death in 1982
- Mark Libby, American diplomat
- Katie Stevens (1992–present), actress and singer, American Idol contestant, known for her role in the MTV series Faking it

== Gallery ==
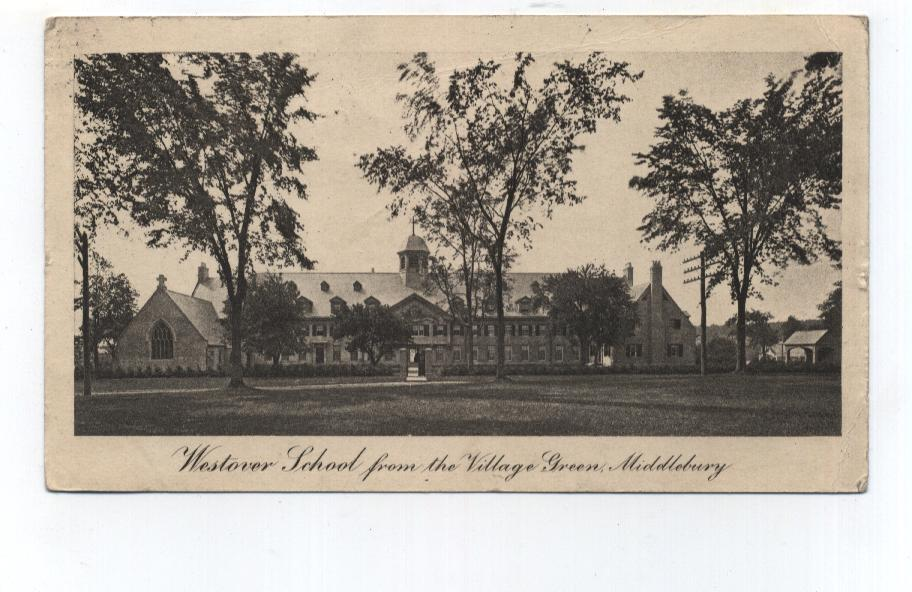
Westover School on Village Green, c. 1912

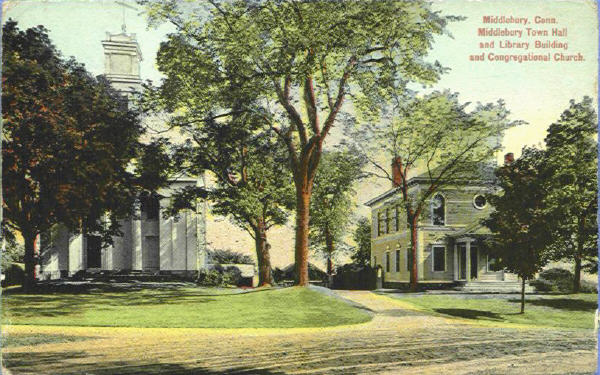
Town Hall/Library and Congregational Church, c. 1910
