= Giuseppina Gabriella Bonino =

Italian Roman Catholic professed religious

Blessed Giuseppina Gabriella of Jesus
- Born: 5 September 1843; Savigliano, Como, Kingdom of Lombardy–Venetia
- Died: 8 February 1906 (aged 62); Savona, Kingdom of Italy
- Venerated in: Roman Catholic Church
- Beatified: 17 May 1995, Saint Peter's Square, Vatican City by Pope John Paul II
- Feast: 8 February
- Attributes: Religious habit
- Patronage: Suore della Sacra Famiglia di Savigliano

Giuseppina Gabriela Bonino (5 September 1843 – 8 February 1906), also known by her religious name Giuseppina Gabriella of Jesus, was an Italian Roman Catholic professed religious and the founder of the Suore della Sacra Famiglia di Savigliano. Bonino dedicated her life to the ill and to orphans and did this in drawing upon her own experience in tending to her ailing father and to orphans in her hometown - all this prior to and after the establishment of her religious congregation.

Her beatification was celebrated in mid-1995 in Saint Peter's Square. The cause started in 1964 under Pope Paul VI - she was titled a Servant of God - while Pope John Paul II titled her later as Venerable in 1994.

== Life ==
Giuseppina Gabriella Bonino was born in Como on 5 September 1843 as the sole child to Domenico Bonino and Giuseppina Ricci. She was baptized on 6 September in the names of "Anna Maria Maddalena Giuseppina". She made her First Communion in 1850 and received her confirmation in 1851.

Bonino moved to Turin in 1855 and made a private vow to remain chaste - with the permission of her spiritual director - in 1861. The Sisters of Saint Joseph of Turin managed her education when she was in high school. Bonino returned - in 1869 - to Savigliano to care for her ailing father and remained in her hometown until he died on 16 January 1874. Bonino underwent a successful operation for her back in 1876 (she was struck with a spinal tumor on 21 May 1876) and made a pilgrimage to Lourdes in France in September 1877 to give thanks to the Madonna for her good health; it was there she felt called to dedicate her life to others. Her mother died in late 1877 not long after Bonino's pilgrimage. She returned to Savigliano to tend to orphans and became active in the affairs of her local parish of San Pietro. In April 1881 she founded a religious order dedicated to the poor and ill as well as to orphans - she was made superior for her entire life. Her order received diocesan approval on 8 September 1887 and she and eleven others professed into her order a month after on 6 October.

On 18 March 1875 she joined the Third Order Carmelites and made her profession into that order on 19 March 1877.

Bonino died in 1906 from pneumonia and had predicted the date of her own death. Her remains were in Savigliano but later moved to the order's motherhouse. The order later received the papal decree of praise from Pope Paul VI on 1 August 1975. It now operates in Brazil since 1965 and in Cameroon since 1980; there were 61 religious in a total of 14 houses as of 2005.

== Beatification ==
The beatification cause opened in Turin in an informative process that Cardinal Maurilio Fossati inaugurated on 31 January 1964 and that Cardinal Anastasio Ballestrero concluded in a solemn Mass he presided over on 18 March 1980. Bonino was named as a Servant of God under Pope Paul VI on 31 January 1964 with the commencement of the process; the Congregation for the Causes of Saints validated the diocesan process on 13 October 1989 and received the Positio from the postulation in 1990. Theologians approved the cause on 5 October 1993 as did the C.C.S. on 14 December 1993; Pope John Paul II confirmed her heroic virtue on 26 March 1994 and named her as Venerable.

The miracle needed for beatification was investigated and received validation from the C.C.S. on 26 March 1993 before a medical board issued their approval to it on 26 May 1994; theologians assented to it on 21 October 1994 as did the C.C.S. on 13 December 1994. John Paul II granted final approval needed for the miraculous healing on 15 December 1994 and later beatified Bonino in Saint Peter's Square on 7 May 1995.
