= A. W. Haydon =

American inventor

Arthur William Haydon
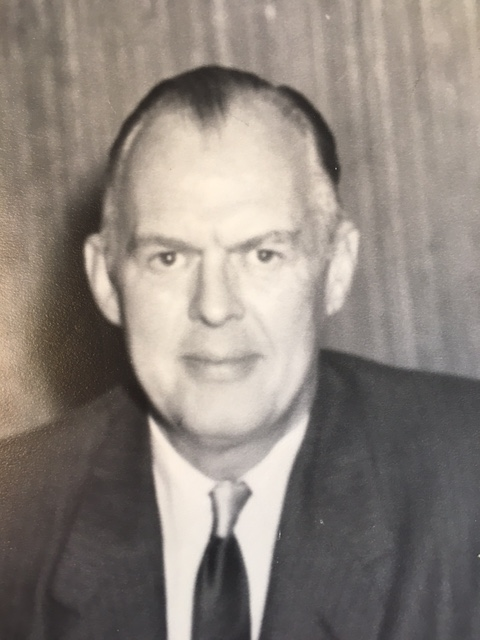
- Born: April 25, 1906; Hinsdale, Illinois, United States
- Died: January 11, 1982 (aged 75); Middlebury, Connecticut, U.S.
- Education: Self-educated
- Occupations: Inventor, businessman

Arthur William Haydon (April 25, 1906 – January 11, 1982; known as A. W. or Bill Haydon) was an American inventor and industrialist known for his work in the field of microminiature electrical timing and governing devices for industrial and military use, some of which were used in early computing devices.

Haydon secured and was granted 82 U.S. patents from 1931 to 1984, many of which continue to have wide industrial use into the 21st century.

In 1933, Haydon set up his own development shop under the name of Haydon Laboratory in Waterbury, Connecticut. In 1937, Haydon Manufacturing Company was incorporated.

In 1945, he created the A. W. Haydon company in Waterbury, producing timing motors and related devices. Haydon sold this company, and many of his patents, in 1951 to North American Philips for over $1,000,000. The A.W. Haydon Company was not dissolved, but was used to handle all sales of the new Division of Phillips. Haydon continued as chief executive of the new Phillips Division. At approximately the same time, Haydon formed a new company named "Haydon Switch, Inc." to produce and distribute precision devices called the miniature snap-action switch which he had invented typified by patents granted as "Snap Action Switch" US Patent #2,700,079; US Patent #2,773,954; US Patent # 2,773,955.

In October 1963, Haydon merged his companies into one entity. The Haydon Instrument Company and Haydon Industries, Incorporated were merged into Haydon Switch, Incorporated, the name of which was changed to Haydon Switch & Instrument, Inc.

Over the years, the company has been sold and merged. In July 2010, Ametek announced that it had acquired Haydon Enterprises, a leading manufacturer of high-precision motion control products, from the Harbour Group, a private operating company based in St. Louis, for approximately $270 million in cash, and is still in operation as a division of Ametek, an American global manufacturer of electronic instruments and electromechanics devices with headquarters in the United States and over 220 manufacturing sites worldwide.

== Early life ==
Arthur William Haydon was raised in Hinsdale, Illinois, on the family farm during the Great Depression years. Haydon held various jobs in high school, delivering newspapers, mowing lawns, setting pins in a bowling alley and even ringing the carillon in the local church tower.

In Haydon's home town, Hinsdale, Illinois, the current supplied by the local utility company made clocks operate in an erratic way – gaining 10 minutes one day, losing 15 the next. It occurred to Haydon that it might just be possible to combine the principles of simple harmonic motion normally used in clocks or watches and still have the clock operate from the power of the local utility company, but independent of the inaccurate frequency control. He found that this could be done with a coil spring attached to an induction motor. This was the basis of Haydon's first patent, No. 1,801,958 issued April 21, 1931, entitled “Reversible Single Phase Induction Motor”.

Haydon used a conventional electric, shaded-pole motor and simply removed the shading coils so it would run in either direction. To this he attached a coil spring. Haydon found that after the motor was initially started in one direction by hand, it would wind up the spring and stall; then be started by the spring in the reverse direction until the spring again stalled the motor and started it in the original direction. This action would continue, with each oscillation having a simple harmonic motion characteristic, providing a time base independent of the frequency of the alternating current supply. Unfortunately, this unit was much too large and expensive for use in household clocks. Since no motors of suitable size or characteristics were available, Haydon started to work in his home workshop to develop an extremely small induction motor which might prove to be suitable, both in cost and size, for home electric clocks. Haydon soon found that the problem of miniaturization was extremely difficult because the torque characteristics of an induction motor decreased rapidly as size was reduced. He also found that no engineering data were available on which to base a sound design. So Haydon studied basic motor theory for a considerable length of time at the John Crerar Library in Chicago where he absorbed the works of Charles Proteus Steinmetz and others.

After finishing his studies, Haydon then built several models of miniaturized induction motors in his own workshop. In so doing, he quickly learned that he was not going to find the solution to the problem by using a normal squirrel-cage rotor. He failed a few times, but his failures finally led to the realization that the performance characteristics he was seeking might be obtained by using permanent magnet steel for the rotor instead of the original squirrel cage induction type rotor. He built many models and finally accomplished the desired operating characteristics. This motor design is covered by Patent No. 1,935,208 and related patents. This motor was capable of oscillating continuously when connected to a hair spring. It would also run synchronously in one direction without the hair spring. This made it usable either independent of, or dependent on, the frequency of current supplied by the local utility company.

== Waterbury Clock ==
In 1930, Haydon Licensed his Patent No. 1,935,208 to the Waterbury Clock Company, in Waterbury, Connecticut, to manufacture his motor for use in clock movements. Haydon himself acted as design engineer to expedite clock production.

Several million clocks later, Haydon tried unsuccessfully to get the Waterbury Clock Company to focus more on the motor and timer field. Haydon felt that there would be industrial and consumer demand for the conveniences his motors offered in products, for example oven and furnace controls, automatic streetlights and traffic controls. Waterbury Clock Company decided to allow Haydon to manufacture these items on his own and in 1933, Haydon left the Waterbury Clock Company to set up his company Haydon Laboratory.

== Defense contracting ==
Haydon started to design a variety of products for wartime use such as time delay relays, repeat cycle timers, and electromechanics devices. Most of the designs were classified and even Haydon's management did not know their end use.

During World War II Haydon made an important contribution to the war effort that made it possible for the United States Army Air Corps (now the United States Air Force) to continue its accurate targeting of strategic and tactical targets. Specifically, reference is made to the Farnsworth Research Bombing Control System that improved upon the Norden Bombsight. Farnsworth Research had assumed that almost any clock company could furnish one important component, a small gear reduction unit, with the necessary clutches and differentials. After searching the clock industry, it was discovered that their assumption was very wrong. Their program for the new electronic bombing system was in jeopardy for the lack of this specialized component. Haydon designed the gear reduction unit for this program by designing a DC motor, patent No. 2,513,410 that was used in aircraft, tanks, submarines, and a variety of portable military equipment so that all of this equipment could be operated by battery supply. This enabled Haydon to provide timers for battery operation that had previously required alternating current for synchronous motor operation.

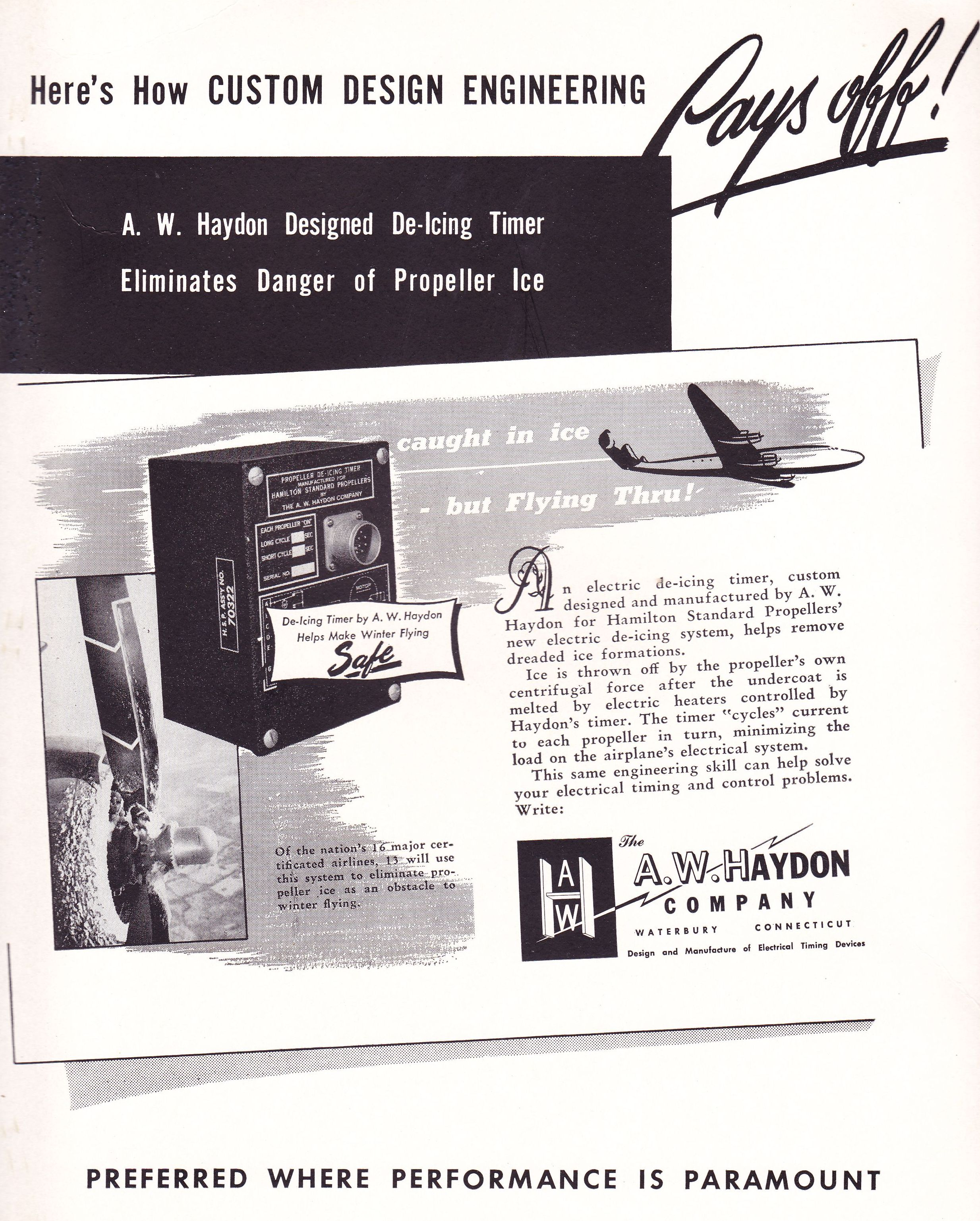
From 1949 Sales Catalog

Haydon found that DC timer applications required accuracy far in excess of anything obtainable by the use of any DC motors then available, even with the best centrifugal governor attached. The only way to obtain the precision timing accuracy required for many applications was to use a crystal oscillator, frequency divider, amplifier, and synchronous motor, the total cost of which was in the neighborhood of $1,000.00 at the time. This device was about the size of a loaf of bread and weighed approximately 15 pounds. Such units were made by other companies but only for applications requiring extreme precision. It was obvious to Haydon that there was a definite need for a much smaller, lighter and less expensive method of producing accurate speed drives for timers and control mechanisms. So, he developed what is well known in the industry as a Chronometric Governor for his DC motors covered by patent No. 2,523,298. It was less than 2 inches in diameter and ½” thick, weighed two ounces and sold as part of the motor to which it was attached for approximately $60.00. This invention gave The A.W. Haydon Company the capability of furnishing precision timers for de-icing, cabin pressurization, microwave tuning, potentiometer time drives and components for

Electronic controls for guidance systems for missiles plus numerous other applications in the aircraft and electronics fields.

== National Aeronautics and Space Administration (NASA) ==
Haydon was involved as a designer and engineer for components specifically contracted for use by NASA projects. Haydon's patented push button switches, specifically the "Sealed Switch" US Patent #2,878,348 patented in the 1950s, was used in the Project Mercury space capsule, manned by Gordon Cooper and Scott Carpenter. These switches were used to fire and release the retro rockets and to release the drogue chute. Republican-American.

Haydon switches are referenced in various NASA related publications, notably page 124 of the specifications of the Project Mercury Manned Space capsule dated August 5, 1960.

Haydon also designed and manufactured a brushless DC electric motor which offered certain performance characteristics, specifically required in flight, and in outer space, such as high starting torque, small size, long life and thermal resistance. Reference is made on page 27 & 40 in NASA publication "Brushless DC Motors", in 1975.

== Miniaturization ==
Haydon continued to focus on miniaturization of his previous patents.

Haydon invented an improved timer in 1961, a micro-miniature synchronous motor the size of two aspirin tablets U.S. Patent No. 3,113,231

A miniature motor developed by Haydon, less than one inch in diameter and weighing less than two ounces, circled the world in satellites, as reported on May 17, 1964, in the Republican-American.

== Clocks and timing systems ==
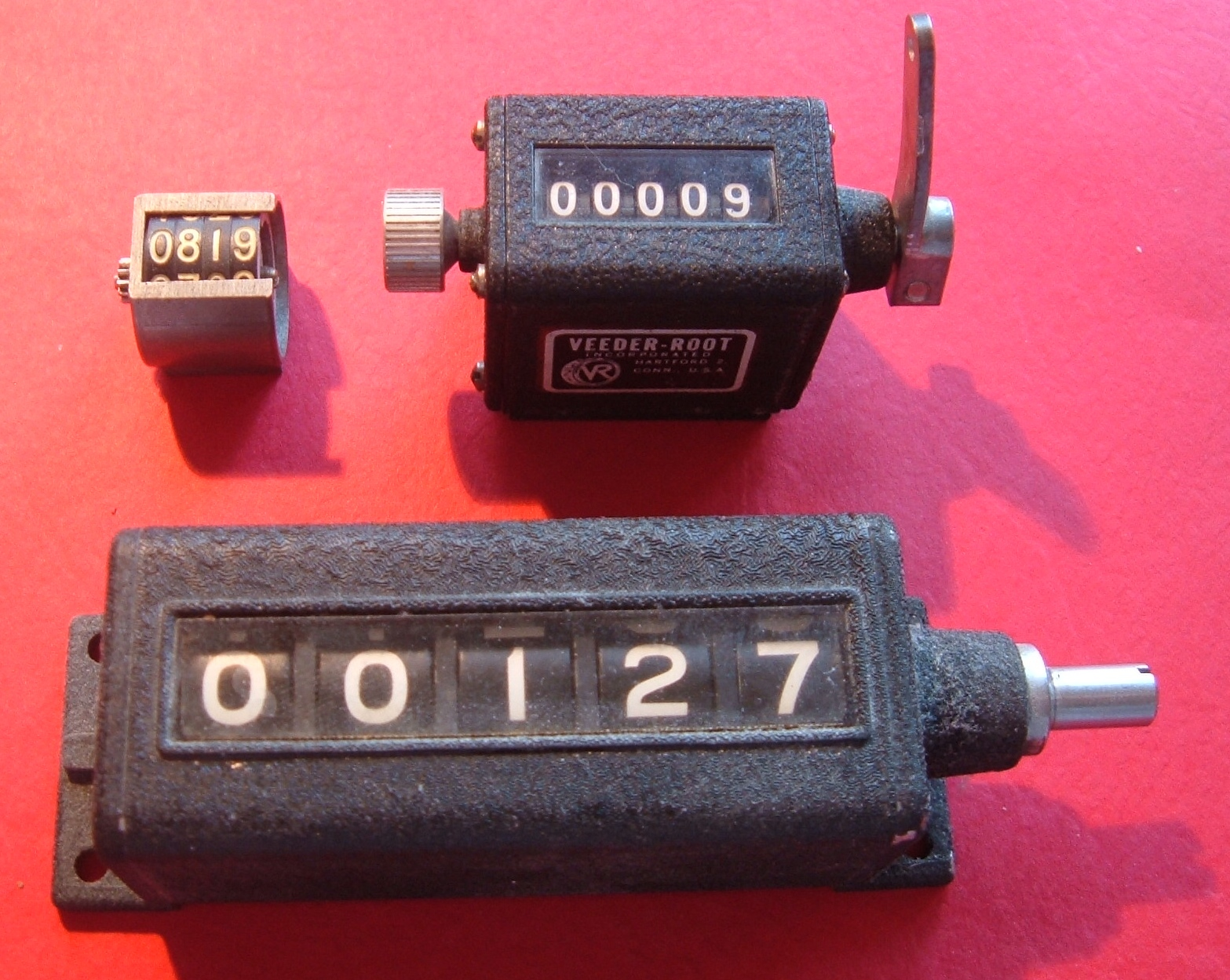
Several mechanical counters

During the 1950s, and 1960s, Haydon became interested in clock systems and the counter (digital). Haydon wanted to produce a novel type of counter specifically designed to overcome the difficulties encountered in a pinion mechanism. In 1959 Haydon designed a "Transfer Counter" U.S. Patent No. 3,069,083. It incorporated an Epicyclic gearing mechanism for advancing the digits so the driving torque is extremely low and uniform. The digits transfer instantaneously and align themselves more accurately providing the capability of high speed counting beyond the range of pinion type counters.

Haydon also developed improvements to timing and clock systems with various patents such as the "Open Face Clock" US Patent #2,976,674. Haydon also designed and created improvements to the popular Alarm Clock "Radio" with patents such as US Patent #2,999,928. As well as improvements to the Alarm Buzzer for Clocks .

In 1972, Haydon designed and patented large clock systems used in schools, libraries, factories and other large properties that relied on time and clock systems. Haydon secured a patent for Clock Systems with US Patent # 3,643,420.

Haydon also patented numerous improvements to clocks systems such as an apparatus used for setting clocks ahead or behind by one hour for Daylight saving time with Patent 3,897,700

== Printed circuits ==
Haydon also invented a printed circuit motor that used a printed circuit that comprised the entire winding and commutator in a single flat printed circuit disc. The motor field is a simple doughnut-shaped piece of ferrite material. This motor is covered by U.S. Patent No. RE25,305. Because of its compactness, simplicity, reliability, and apparent low cost in volume production, the North American Phillips Company took exclusive royalty-paying licenses throughout the world except in the United States and Canada. The Haydon Switch & Instrument Company retained manufacturing rights in the United States and Canada.

== Stepper motors ==
During the 1960s and early 1970s Haydon began to focus on the market for the stepper motor and linear actuator, with US Patent #3,370,189 as well as the "Cylindrical Stepper Motor" US Patent #3,495,107 . A Stepper motor is a DC motor that moves in discrete steps. They have multiple coils that are organized in groups called "phases". By energizing each phase in sequence the motor will rotate, one step at a time. Haydon Switch and Instrument began to manufacture these devices for global demand, and continues today to focus on this market as Haydon Kerk, a division of Ametek. With computer controlled stepping one can achieve very precise positioning and/or speed control. For this reason, stepper motors are the motor of choice for many precision motion controls.

Haydon continued to improve upon the function of various counting devices with wide commercial and industrial use, with patents such as the "Counting Device" in 1975 with US Patent # 3,896,298.

== Switches ==
Over the years as Haydon continued to redesign and innovate various mechanical devices he found that the switches commonly available to operate them had flaws. Because of this Haydon would go on to redesign and invent new switches. The newly designed switches demonstrated considerable value outside of their intended use for industries of automation, computing, communications, and in aircraft and missile electronics, instrumentation and control.

From 1948 to 1970 Haydon secured patents such as in 1948 the Radio Time Switch U.S Patent 2,439,732, in 1955 the Snap Action Switch U.S Patent 2,700,079, in 1956 the Snap Action Switch U.S Patent 2,773,954, in 1959 the Sealed Switch and Actuator Assembly U.S Patent 2,878,348, in 1961 the Snap Action Switch U.S Patent 2,977,436 and in 1969 the Cam-Operated Switch U.S Patent 3,427,574.

== Last patent and death ==
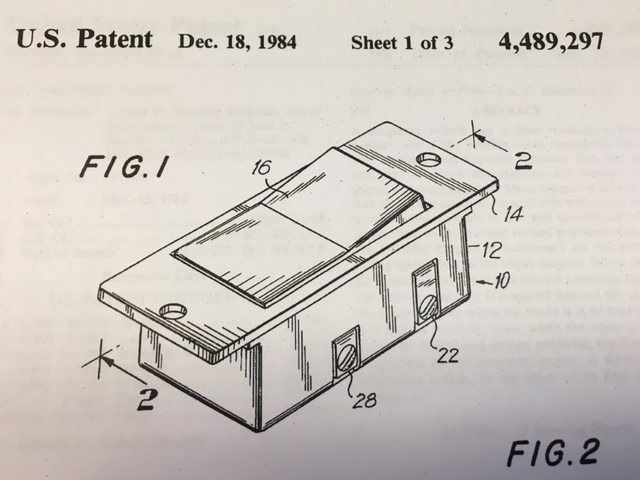
Photo of drawing from magnetic switch US Patent#4,489,297

His last patent, a modification of a magnetic switch commonly found in homes, was granted on December 18, 1984, almost two years after his death. It is the "Magnetic Switch" U.S. Patent No. 4,489,297

Haydon's last patent was granted after his death. Haydon died in Middlebury, Connecticut, on January 11, 1982, of an aortic dissection. His last patent, a modification of a magnetic switch commonly found in homes, was granted on December 18, 1984, almost 2 years after his death. It is the "Magnetic Switch" U.S. Patent No. 4,489,297

== Legacy ==
Many of Haydon's patents are held in an archive at various museums such as the Smithsonian Institution National Air and Space Museum and The Vintage Technology Association located in Dayton, Ohio.
