= Deaths in January 1982 =

The following is a list of notable deaths in January 1982.

Entries for each day are listed alphabetically by surname. A typical entry lists information in the following sequence:

- Name, age, country of citizenship at birth, subsequent country of citizenship (if applicable), reason for notability, cause of death (if known), and reference.

== January 1982 ==
=== 1 ===
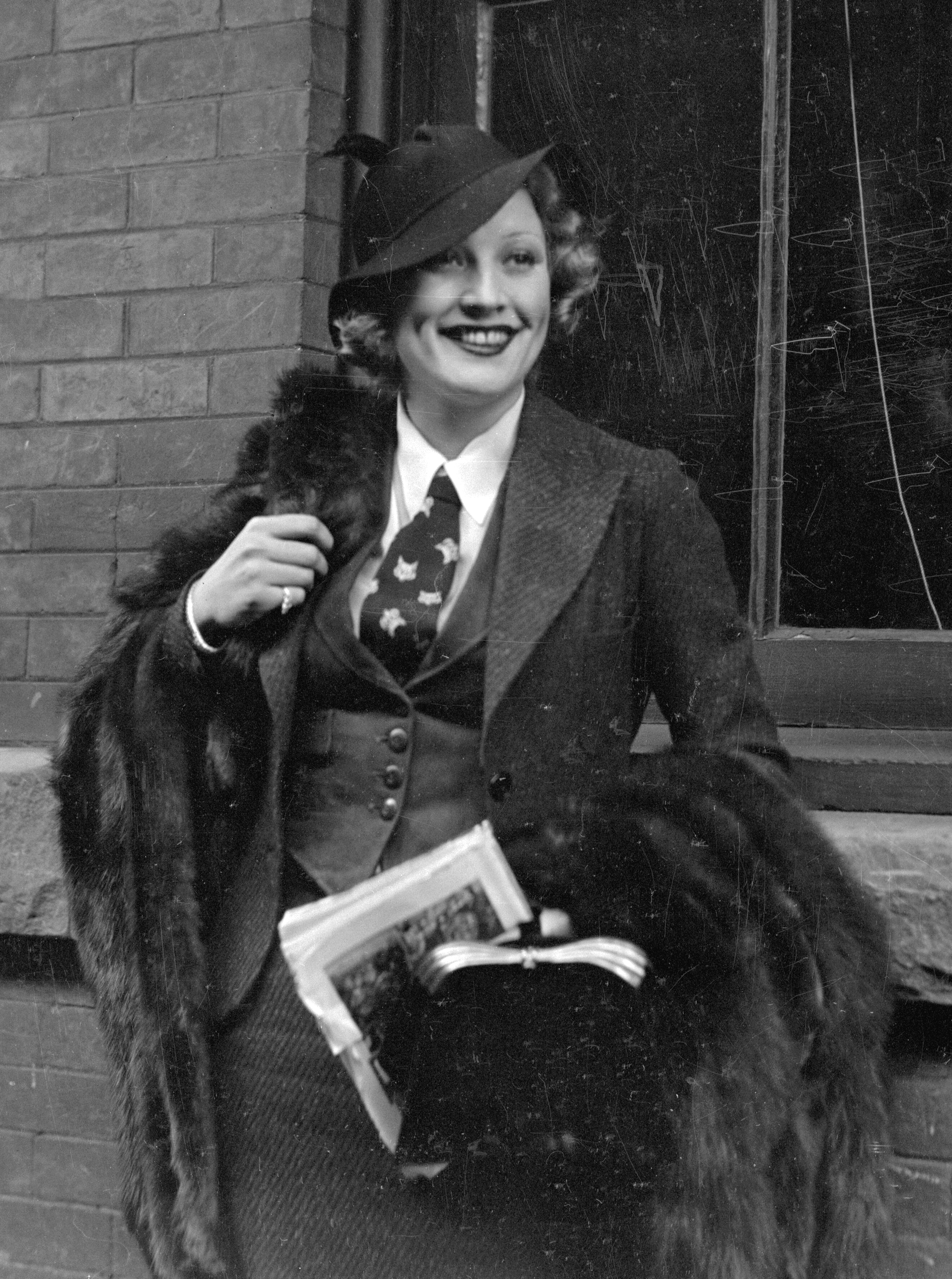
Margot Grahame

- Paul Belmondo, 83, French sculptor
- Estella Blain, 51, French actress
- Victor Buono, 43, American actor
- John Fanning, 78, Irish politician
- Albert Earl Godfrey, 91, Canadian flying ace
- Margot Grahame, 70, English actress
- Eli Ilan, 54, Israeli sculptor
- Frano Kršinić, 84, Croatian sculptor
- Jack Macdonald, 74, New Zealand sportsman
- Charles Malpas, 82, Australian inventor and businessman
- Kálmán Marvalits, 80, Hungarian athlete and Olympian
- Gillis le Fèvre de Montigny, 80, Dutch military officer
- Gustav Niemann, 82, German mechanical engineer
- Ruth Vollmer, 80, German conceptual artist

=== 2 ===
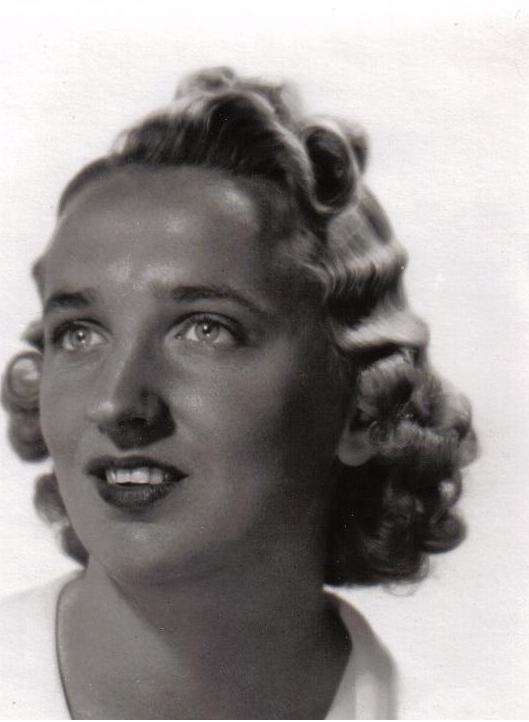
Ivana Lang

- Johan Barendregt, 57, Dutch psychologist and chess International Master
- David Abraham Cheulkar, 73, Indian actor
- Victor Fontan, 89, French cyclist
- Tam Galbraith, 64, Scottish Unionist politician
- Monte Hale, 42, American sportscaster
- Fred Harman, 79, American cartoonist
- Antoni Knot, Polish scholar, historian, librarian and teacher
- Ivana Lang, 69, Croatian composer, pianist and piano teacher
- Jill McDonald, 54, New-Zealand-born children's writer and illustrator
- Leo Stern, 80, Austrian-German left-wing political activist
- David Záizar, 53, Mexican mariachi singer and actor

=== 3 ===
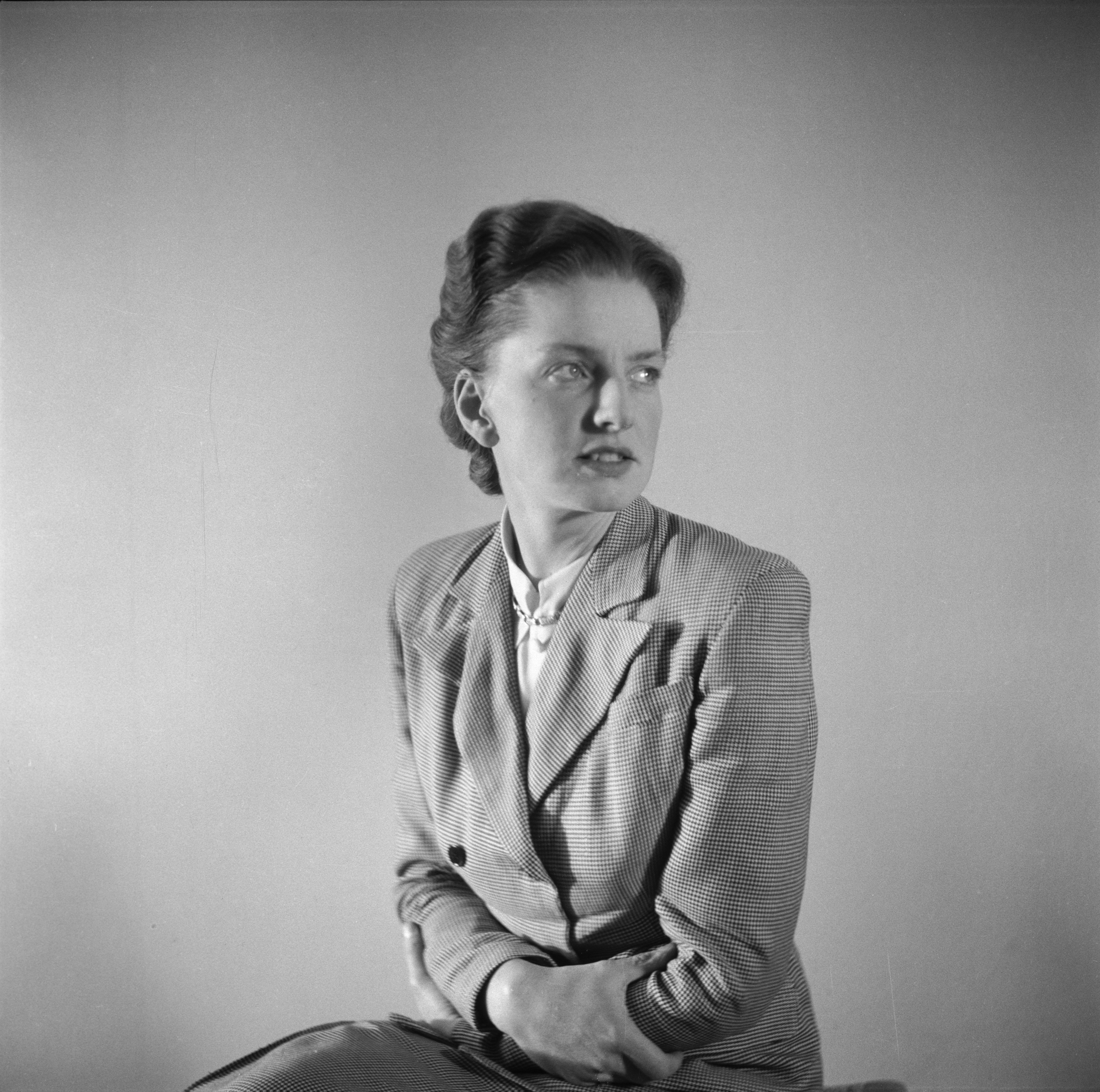
Heidi Blomstedt

Grigory Sarkisovich Grigoryants

- Heidi Blomstedt, 70, Finnish designer
- Arthur Graham Brown, 62, Australian medical doctor and amateur ornithologist
- Tommy Bryant, 51, American jazz double-bassist
- Pat Cameron, 86, Canadian politician
- Erwin Canham, 77, American journalist
- Hermann Czirniok, 78, German politician
- Finis Farr, 77, American writer and biographer
- Grigory Sarkisovich Grigoryants, 62, Soviet surgeon
- Inger Haldorsen, 86, Norwegian physician, midwife and politician
- Elmer George Homrighausen, 81, American theologian
- Mohamed Jamoussi, 71, Tunisian singer, composer, and poet
- Hugo Klaerner, 73, American baseball pitcher
- Étienne Onimus, 75, French basketball player
- Derek Sealy, 69, West Indian cricketer
- Kenny Starke, 81, South African international rugby union player
- Wilfred Wood, 84, British soldier awarded the Victoria Cross

=== 4 ===
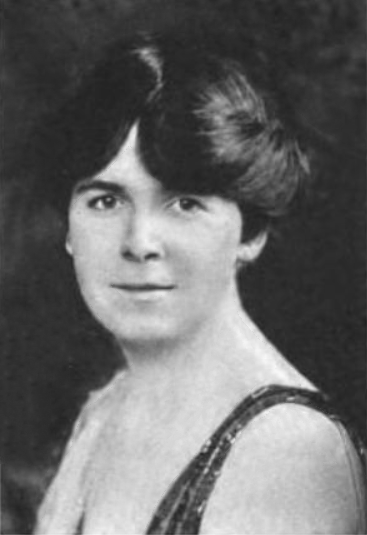
Margaret Culkin Banning

- Margaret Culkin Banning, 90, American writer
- Wykeham Cornwallis, 2nd Baron Cornwallis, 89, British peer, cavalry officer and amateur cricketer
- Eunice Renshaw Geiger, 90, American First Lady of Guam
- Ray Hanson, 86, American military officer and college sports coach and administrator
- Trygve Hoff, 86, Norwegian businessman, writer and editor
- Gorilla Jones, 75, American boxer
- Gordon F. Marsh, 73, American politician
- Kathryn Scola, 90, American screenwriter
- Elmer Sopha, 57, Canadian politician
- Francisco Valdés Subercaseaux, 73, Chilean Roman Catholic prelate

=== 5 ===
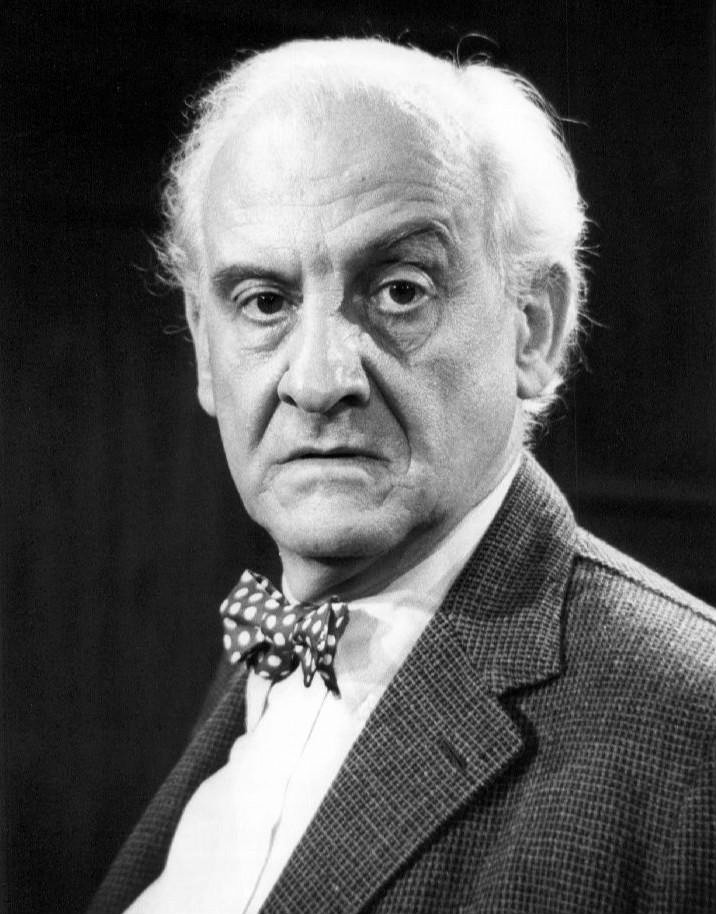
Hans Conried

- Elizabeth Bagshaw, 100, Canadian physician
- Neal Baker, 77, American baseball player
- Gilbert Betts, 65, English cricketer
- Hans Conried, 64, American actor and comedian (Peter Pan, Hoppity Hooper, Mrs. Parkington), complications from a heart attack.
- Lilian Constantini, 79, French actress
- Edmund Herring, 89, senior Australian Army officer during the WWII
- Harvey Lembeck, 58, American actor
- Gustave Roy, 74, Canadian politician
- Thomas Stang, 84, Norwegian forester and businessperson

=== 6 ===
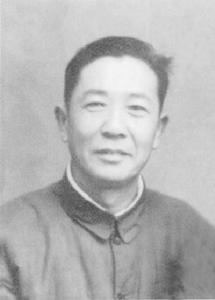
Shang Yue

- Katherine Bacon, 85, English classical pianist
- John Bradley, 93, Royal Air Force officer
- Kurt Ettinger, 80, Austrian fencer
- Harry Mews, 84, Canadian politician
- Wally Post, 52, American baseball player
- Shang Yue, 80, Chinese Marxist economic historian, author and professor

=== 7 ===
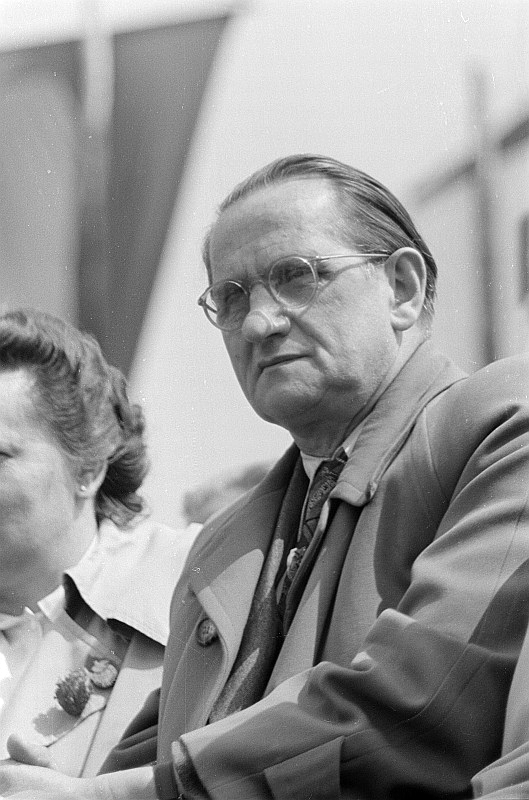
Max Opitz

- Chet Falk, 76, American baseball player
- Almond E. Fisher, 68, United States Army officer
- Kay Hammond, 80, American actress
- Jan Gałązka, 36, Polish boxer
- Vilhelm Lund, 81, Norwegian actor
- Al Murray, 75, Canadian professional ice hockey player
- Max Opitz, 91, German politician
- Lady Pamela Smith, 67, English socialite
- Frank Van der Veer, 60, Academy Award winning American optical and visual special effects artist

=== 8 ===
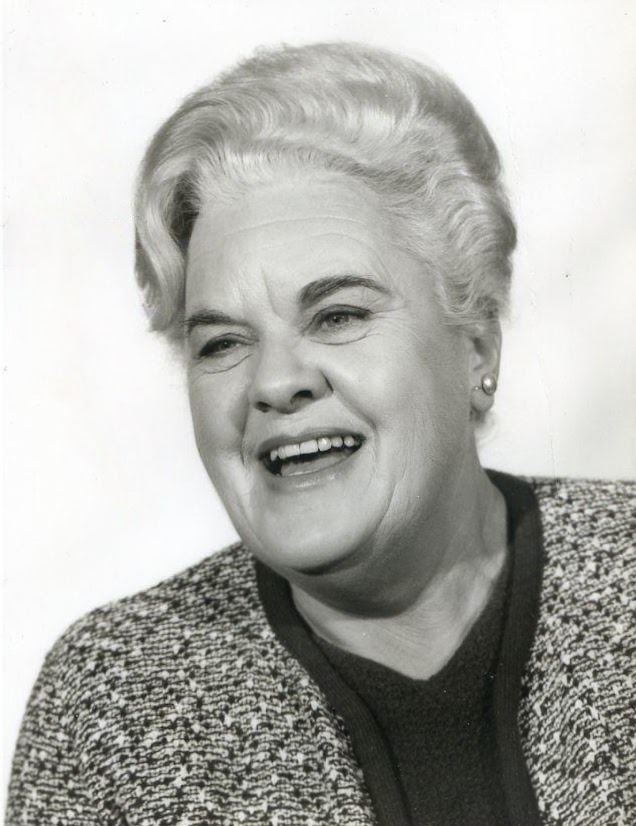
Reta Shaw

- Grégoire Aslan, 73, Armenian actor
- Feliza Bursztyn, 48, Colombian sculptor
- Daan de Groot, 48, Dutch track cyclist and Olympian
- Tony Méndez, 79, Puerto Rican politician
- Hugh Porter, 70, English cricketer
- Reta Shaw, 69, American actress
- Lucille Lee Stewart, 92, American actress
- Irwin St. John Tucker, 95, American priest of the Episcopal Church and socialist activist

=== 9 ===
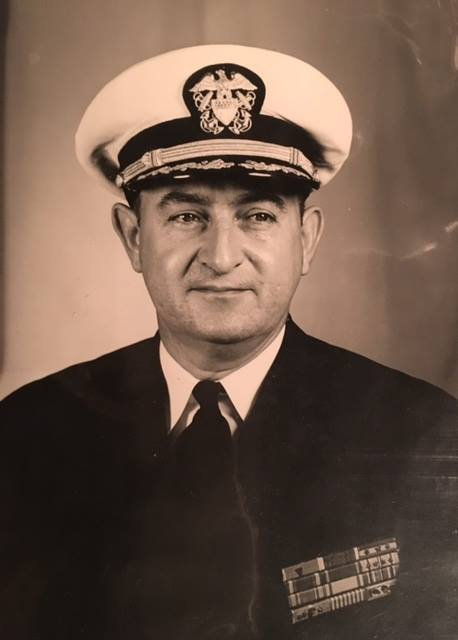
Francis W. Kelly

- Nurullah Berk, 75, Turkish painter, writer and academic
- Howard L. Chace, 84, American linguist
- Douglas Cox, 62, Australian cricketer
- Francis W. Kelly, 71, American Catholic priest and army chaplain
- Les Laver, 81, Australian rules footballer
- Vido Musso, 68, American jazz saxophonist
- Sid Robinson, 79, American middle-distance runner, Olympian, and researcher
- Jan Schilt, 87, Dutch-American astronomer, inventor of the Schilt photometer
- Clarence Smith, 79, South African cricketer
- Clara Steuermann, 59, American music librarian, music editor, pianist, and archivist

=== 10 ===
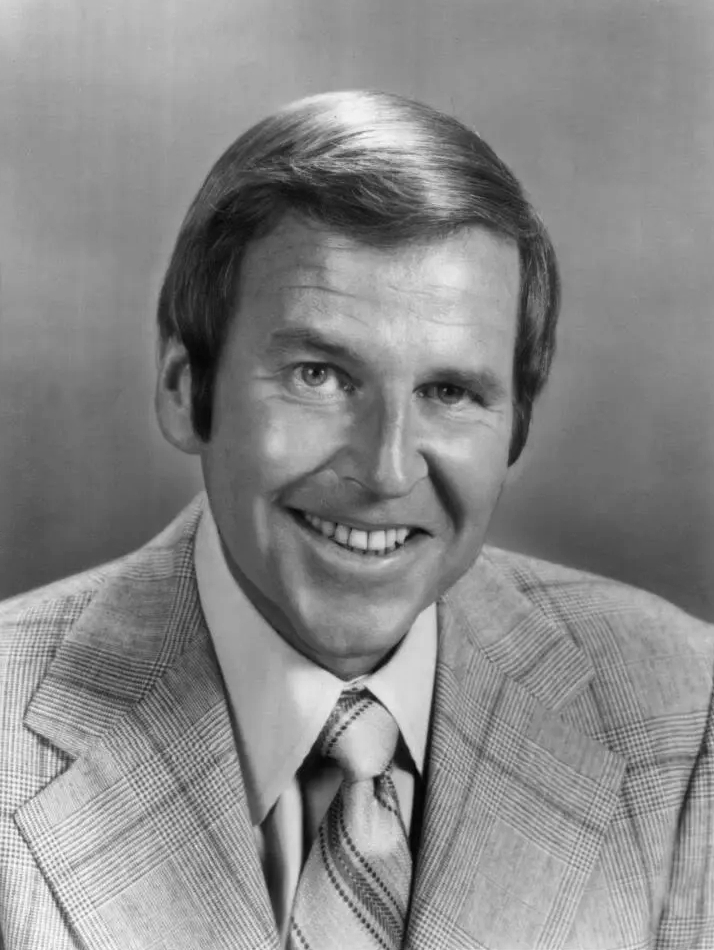
Paul Lynde

- Romeo Roy Blanchette, 69, American prelate of the Roman Catholic Church
- Raymond Broshears, 46, gay Pentecostal Evangelist preacher and activist
- Edward Colville, 76, British Army officer
- Mohammed Helmy, 80, Egyptian-German physician
- Ignacia Jasso, Mexican drug dealer (b. 1901)
- Stan Long, 52, Canadian ice hockey player
- Paul Lynde, 55, American comedian, actor and game show panelist
- Charles Melis, 88, Belgian long-distance runner
- Ben Starret, 64, American football player
- Lazar Weiner, 84, Imperial Russian-born, American-naturalized composer

=== 11 ===
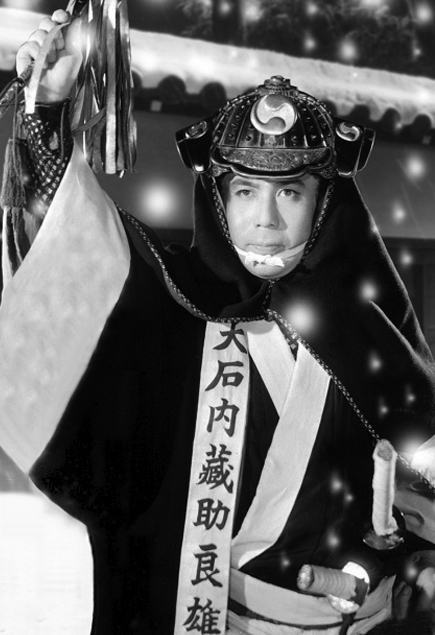
Matsumoto Hakuō I

- Bruno Diekmann, 84, German politician
- Peroslav Ferković, 78, Croatian athlete
- Matsumoto Hakuō I, 71, Japanese kabuki actor
- A. W. Haydon, 75, American inventor
- Jiro Horikoshi, 78, Japanese aircraft designer
- Ronald Lewis, 53, Welsh actor
- Madeline Montalban, 72, English astrologer and ceremonial magician
- Kenneth Strong, 81, senior officer of the British Army
- Manya Surve, 37, Indian gangster
- Ivor Owen Thomas, 83, British trade unionist and Labour Party politician
- Carl M. Voyles, 83, American gridiron football coach, college athletics administrator, and sports executive
- Larry Walbridge, 84, American professional football center
- Leslie Arthur Wilcox, 77, English artist
- Ben T. Williams, 70, Oklahoma Supreme Court justice

=== 12 ===
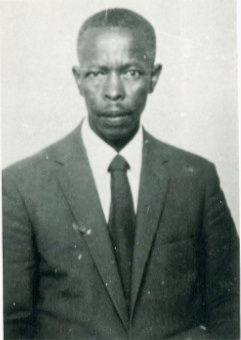
Joshua Pulumo Mohapeloa

- Hervey Alan, 71, English operatic bass and voice teacher
- Jyotirmoy Basu, 61, Indian politician
- Joseph Charles Bequaert, 95, Belgian-born American naturalist
- Harold W. Chase, 59, American professor of political science and major general in the United States Marine Corps Reserve
- Emil Hass Christensen, 78, Danish actor
- Curtis Henderson, 70, American baseball player
- William Hendriksen, 81, Dutch-born American theologian and minister
- Rainer Hinteregger, 37, Austrian rower
- Dorothy Howell, 83, English composer and pianist
- Joshua Pulumo Mohapeloa, 73, Sotho composer
- Frank Crowther Roberts, 90, British Army officer

=== 13 ===
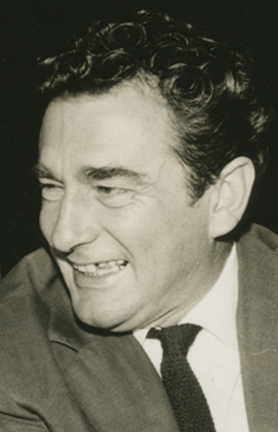
Marcel Camus

- Jules Bender, 67, American collegiate and professional basketball player
- Pete Bostwick, 72, American court tennis player, a steeplechase jockey and horse trainer
- Jack Bray, 66, Australian rules footballer
- Cliff Butler, 58, American musician
- Marcel Camus, 69, French film director
- Harvey Clifford, 55, Canadian alpine skier
- Franklin Hansen, 84, American sound engineer and Academy Award winner
- Sigurd F. Olson, 82, American writer and environmentalist
- Mamidipudi Venkatarangayya, 93, Telugu writer

=== 14 ===
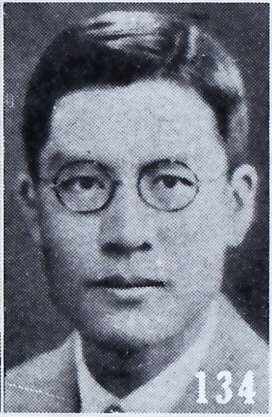
Hsu Shu-hsi

- Ernst Dubach, 100, Swiss racing cyclist
- Juan José Espinosa San Martín, 63, Spain's Minister of Finance
- Jesse Hubbard, 86, American baseball player
- John Pennycuick, 82, English barrister and judge
- Hsu Shu-hsi, 89, Chinese diplomat
- Verners Vitands, 78, Latvian architect
- Justin Wijayawardhene, 77, Sri Lankan politician, teacher, and author
- George Wood, 83, British Army officer

=== 15 ===
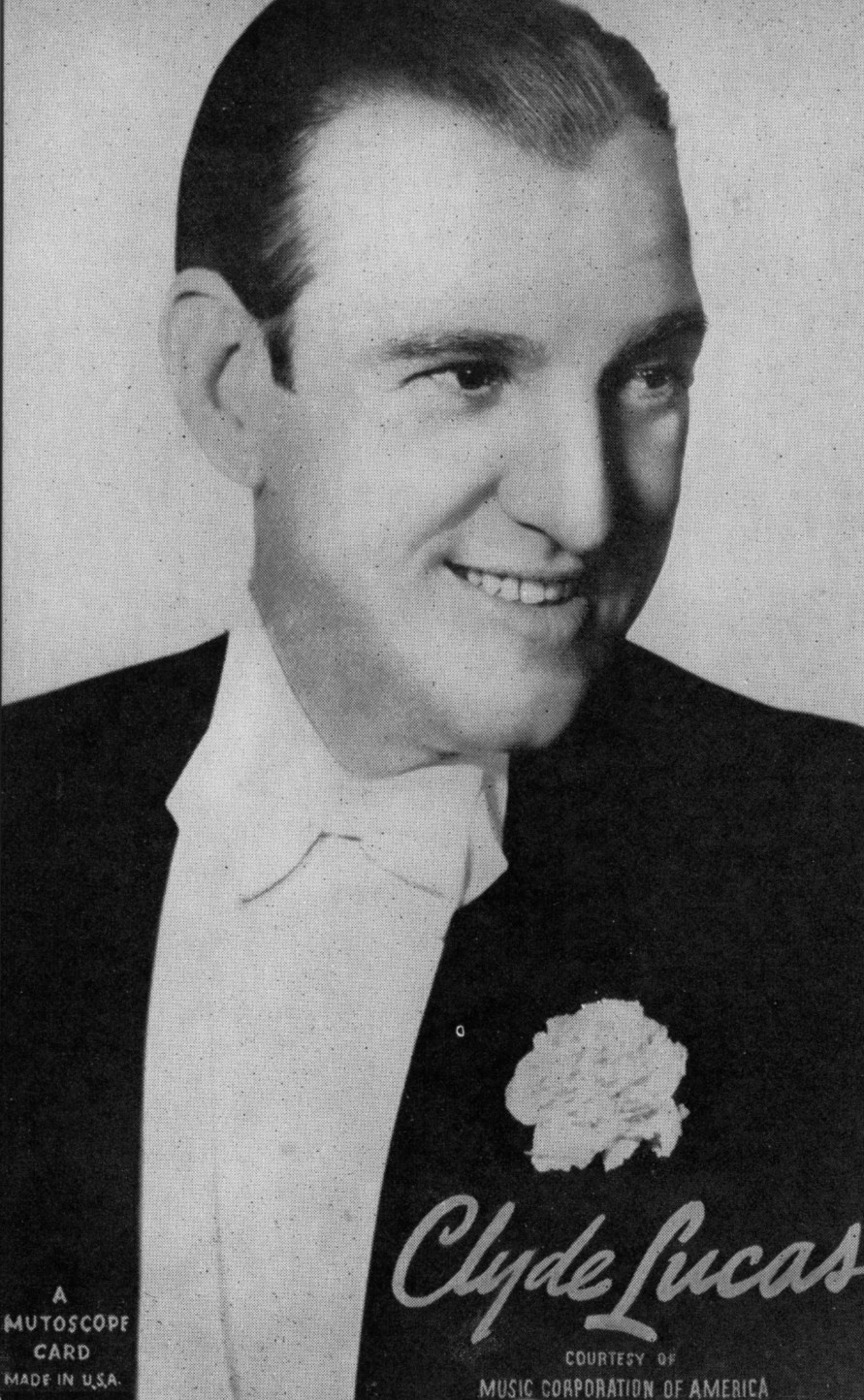
Clyde Lucas

- Stewart Barrett, 80, Irish water polo player
- Wally Bishop, 77, American cartoonist
- Billy Collins, 72, Australian footballer
- Douglas Glover, 73, British politician and military officer
- Arthur Verney Hammond, 89, British Indian Army officer
- Seymour Hess, 61, American meteorologist and planetary scientist
- John Jarman, 66, American politician from Oklahoma
- Clyde Lucas, 80, American big-band leader and golf pro
- Robert Lynn, 63, British film and TV director
- John Calvin Moore, 81, American college football coach, teacher, court clerk, and television host
- Harry Reeks, 61, American landscape painter and war artist for the United States Marine Corps
- George W. Renchard, 74, American diplomat
- Red Smith, 76, American sportswriter
- Charles Stuart, 94, Scotland international rugby union player

=== 16 ===
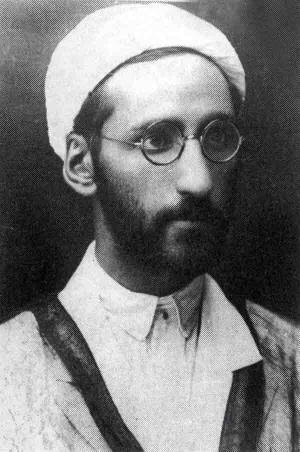
Ali Dashti

- Harald Agersnap, 82, Danish composer, conductor, cellist, and pianist
- Josip Andreis, 72, Croatian musicologist
- Astrid Berwald, 95, Swedish pianist and piano teacher
- Ali Dashti, 84, Iranian writer and politician
- Emil C. Danenberg, 64, American pianist
- Marcel Francisci, 62, French politician
- Basil Goulding, 72, Irish art collector, cricketer, squash player, industrialist, prominent businessman and amateur architect
- Moshe Harif, 48, Israeli politician and kibbutz activist
- Ramón J. Sender, 80, Spanish novelist, essayist and journalist
- Aleksandr Shabalin, 67, Russian Soviet Navy officer and torpedo boat commander
- Thomas Shirley, 73, British Royal Air Force officer
- Len Wigraft, 84, Australian rules footballer

=== 17 ===
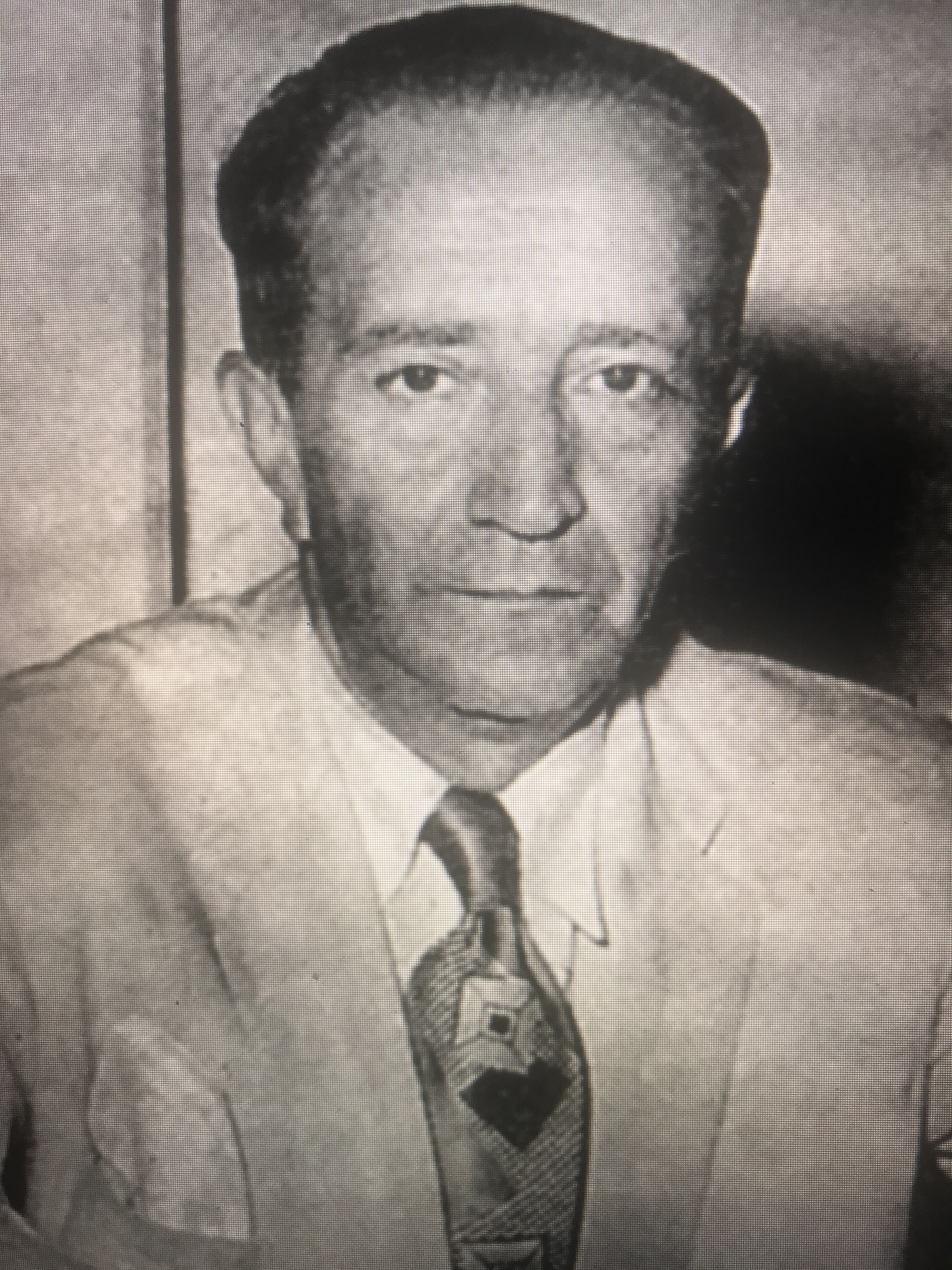
Humberto Salvador

- John Bessant, 89, English cricketer
- Pierre De Cazenove De Pradines, French World War I flying ace
- Jusuf Gërvalla, 38, Kosovo Albanian activist, writer, and musician
- Vera Mae Green, 53, American anthropologist, educator, and scholar
- T. Nelson Metcalf, 91, American football and basketball player
- James Michels, 63, United States Marine officer
- Juan O'Gorman, 76, Mexican painter and architect
- Johannes Pedersen, 89, Danish gymnast and Olympic medalist
- William Price, 86, British Royal Air Force officer
- Fred Roberts, 74, American football guard
- Humberto Salvador, 72, Ecuadorian writer, lawyer, and psychoanalyst
- Varlam Shalamov, 74, Russian writer, journalist, poet, and Gulag survivor
- Irving Starr, 76, American film producer
- Andy Wilf, 32, American painter
- Yetta Zwerling, 87, American actress

=== 18 ===
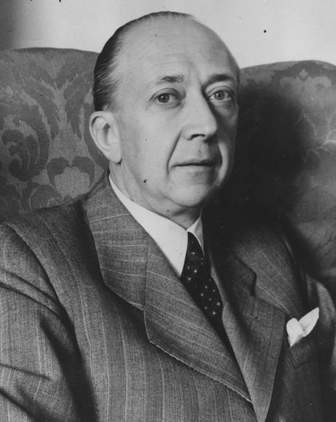
Jenő Ghyczy

- Nérée Arsenault, 70, Canadian politician and forest engineer
- Bob Barrett, 82, American baseball player
- Frank C. Baxter, 85, American scholar and television personality
- Stan Biggs, 46, Australian rules footballer
- Clarence G. Burton, 95, American politician from Virginia
- Jenő Ghyczy, 88, Hungarian Minister of Foreign Affairs
- Phil Greenwald, 63, American entertainment director
- Enver Ziya Karal, Turkish historian and university administrator
- Trent Lehman, 20, American child actor
- Juan O'Gorman, 76, Mexican painter and architect
- Josef Mai, 94, German World War I flying ace
- Alec Robertson, 89, British music critic
- Delmar T. Spivey, 76, American military officer
- Jackie Tobin, 61, American professional baseball player
- Burnet Tuthill, 93, American conductor, composer and musicologist
- Huang Xianfan, 82, Chinese historian, ethnologist and educator

=== 19 ===
- Frieda Goldman-Eisler, 74, British psychologist and pioneer in the field of psycholinguistics
- Boubou Hama, Nigerien writer, historian, and politician
- Harry Hanan, 65, British cartoonist
- Börje Larsson, 71, Swedish screenwriter and film director
- Bapoo Malcolm Sr., 69, Indian cyclist
- Charles Plumb, 82, American cartoonist
- Elis Regina, 36, Brazilian singer
- Leopold Trepper, 77, Polish Communist and career Soviet agent of the Red Army Intelligence
- Semyon Tsvigun, 64, Ukrainian Soviet officer of the KGB
- Fritz Wagner, 66, German actor
- Ernest David Weiss, 79, Polish-Jew naturalised British transport economist and Soviet spy
- Ken Wendt, 71, American football player, jurist, and politician
- Marya Zaturenska, 79, American poet

=== 20 ===
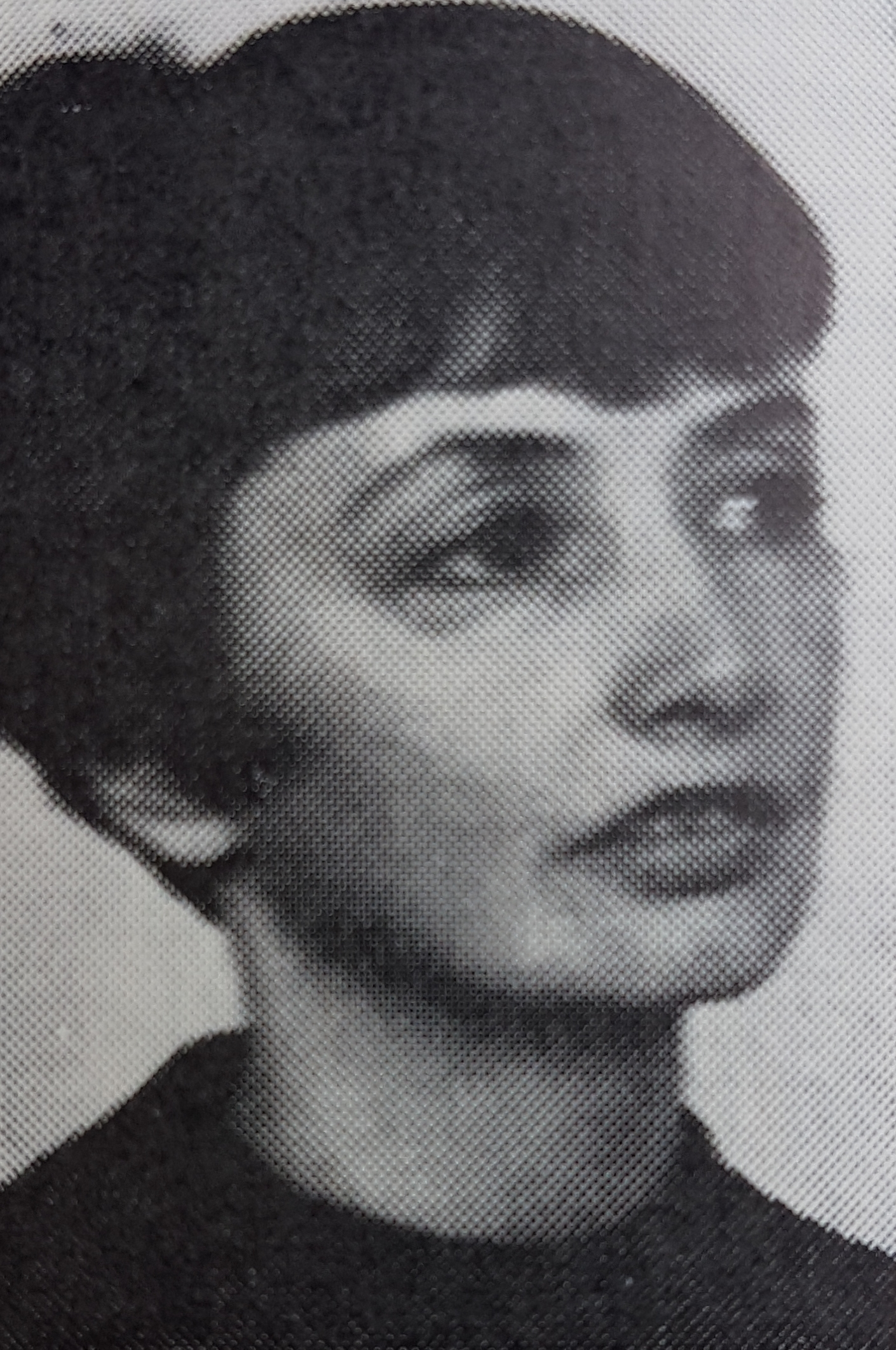
Birgit Ståhl-Nyberg

- Alice Blinn, 92, American educator, home efficiency expert, and magazine editor
- Marc Demeyer, 31, professional road racing cyclist
- Rubem Siqueira Maia, 73, Brazilian physician and politician
- Birgit Ståhl-Nyberg, 53, Swedish artist
- Karl Stumpp, 85, German ethnographer
- Keith Westbrook, 94, Australian cricketer

=== 21 ===
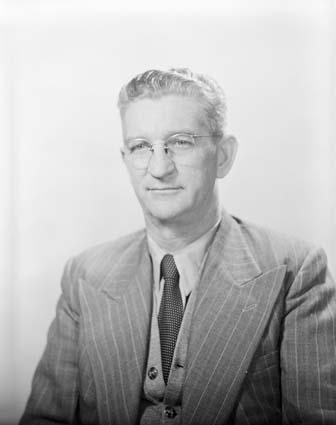
Victor Kearney

- Hayim Halevy Donin, 53, American Orthodox rabbi and author
- André Huc-Santana, 69, French operatic bass
- Victor Kearney, 78, Australian politician
- H. D. F. Kitto, 84, British classical scholar
- Al Lefevre, 83, American baseball player
- Käthe Lettner, 75, Austrian alpine skier
- Hans Tröger, 85, German general in the Wehrmacht during World War II

=== 22 ===
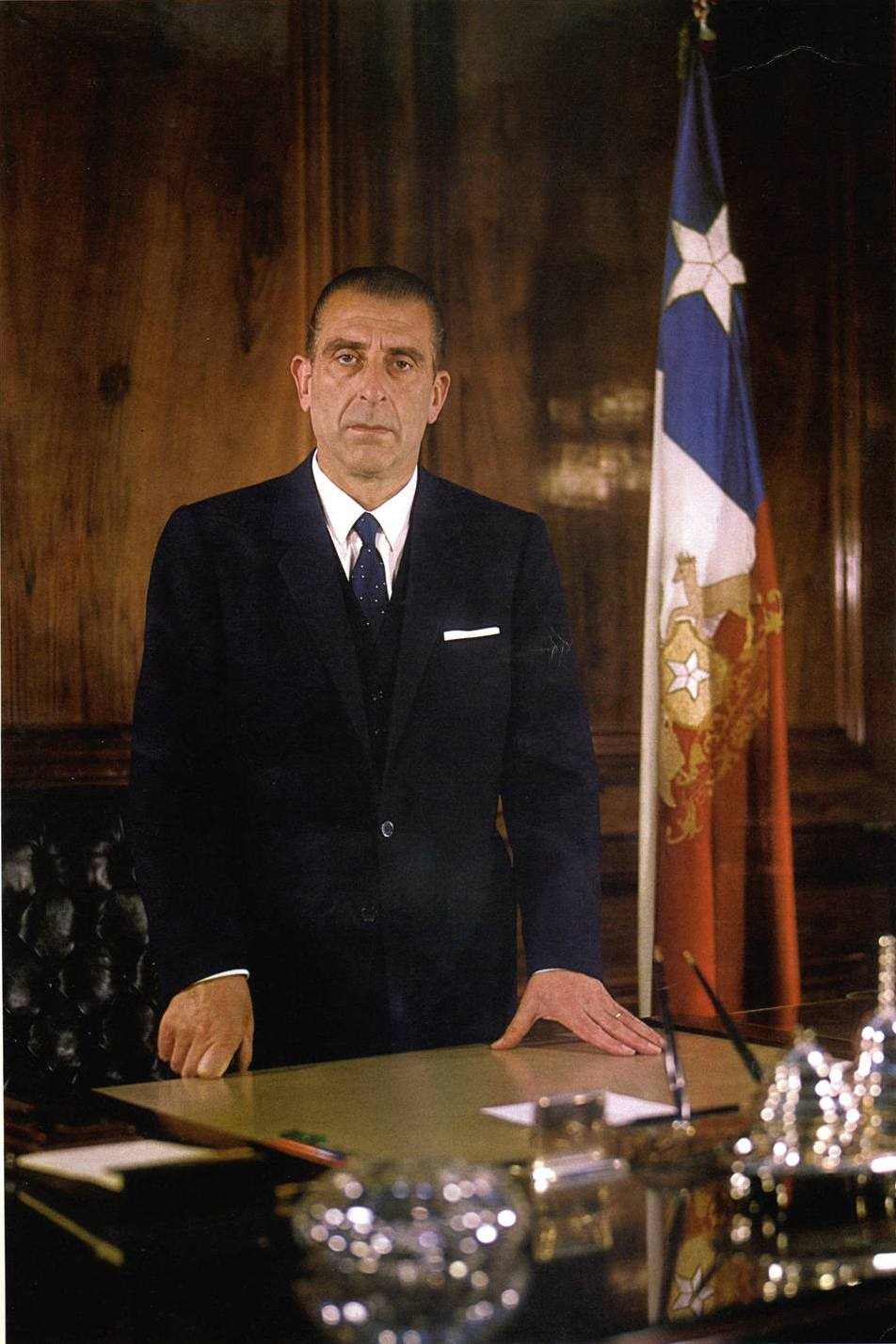
Eduardo Frei Montalva

- Rachel Blodgett Adams, 87, American mathematician
- Edwin Carolan, Gaelic footballer
- Penelope Dudley-Ward, 67, English actress
- Hans Fidesser, 82, Austrian tenor and actor
- Arne Lie, 60, Norwegian actor
- Bruce Lonsdale, 32, Canadian politician
- George James Macdonald, 60, New Zealander naval officer
- Eduardo Frei Montalva, 71, 27th President of Chile
- Tommy Tucker, 48, American blues singer-songwriter and pianist
- Lester Evans Willis, 74, American baseball player
- Pantelis Zervos, Greek actor

=== 23 ===
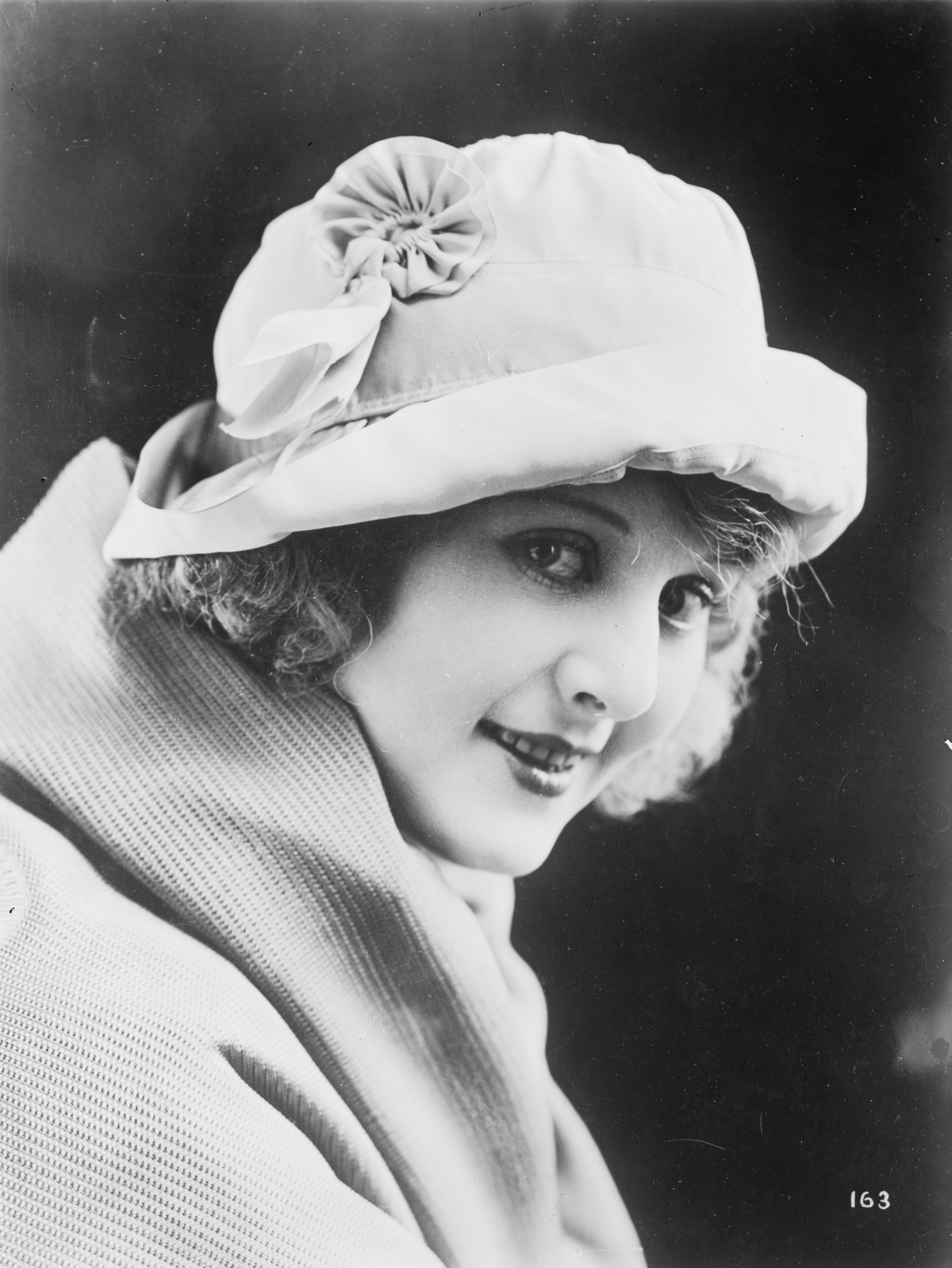
Hope Hampton

- Maria Archer, 83, Portuguese writer
- Les Chapple, 83, Australian rules footballer
- Ragini Devi, 88, American dancer
- Hope Hampton, 84, American silent motion picture actress and producer
- Jim Hopper, 62, American baseball player
- M. B. Shetty, Indian actor
- Buck White, 70, American golfer

=== 24 ===
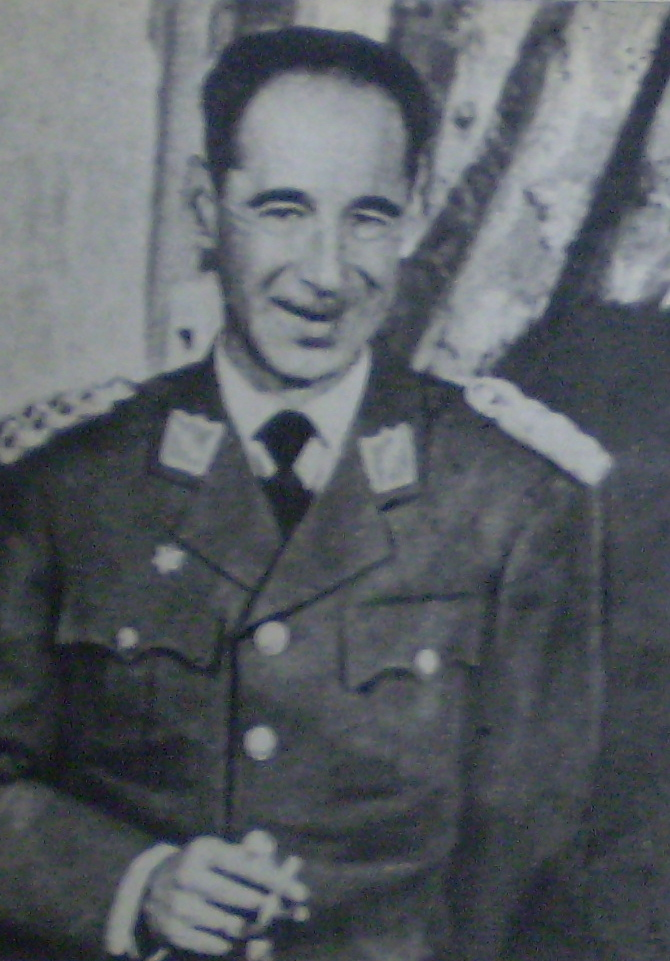
Alfredo Ovando Candía

- Humberto Álvarez Suárez, 86, Chilean lawyer, academic and politician
- Karol Borsuk, 76, Polish mathematician
- Steamer Horning, 89, American football player
- Diana Kingsmill Wright, 73, Canadian athlete, journalist and activist
- Henryk Kowalski, 70, Polish Jewish violinist and composer
- Alfredo Ovando Candía, 63, Bolivian military officer and political leader who served as the 48th president of Bolivia
- María Teresa Prieto, 85 or 86, Spanish composer and pianist
- Fernando Sánchez Polack, 61, Spanish actor
- Ben Shields, 78, American baseball player
- Nils Sletbak, 86, Norwegian jurist and theatre director
- Julian Snow, Baron Burntwood, 71, British peer and Labour Party politician
- Tania, 58, American abstract artist

=== 25 ===
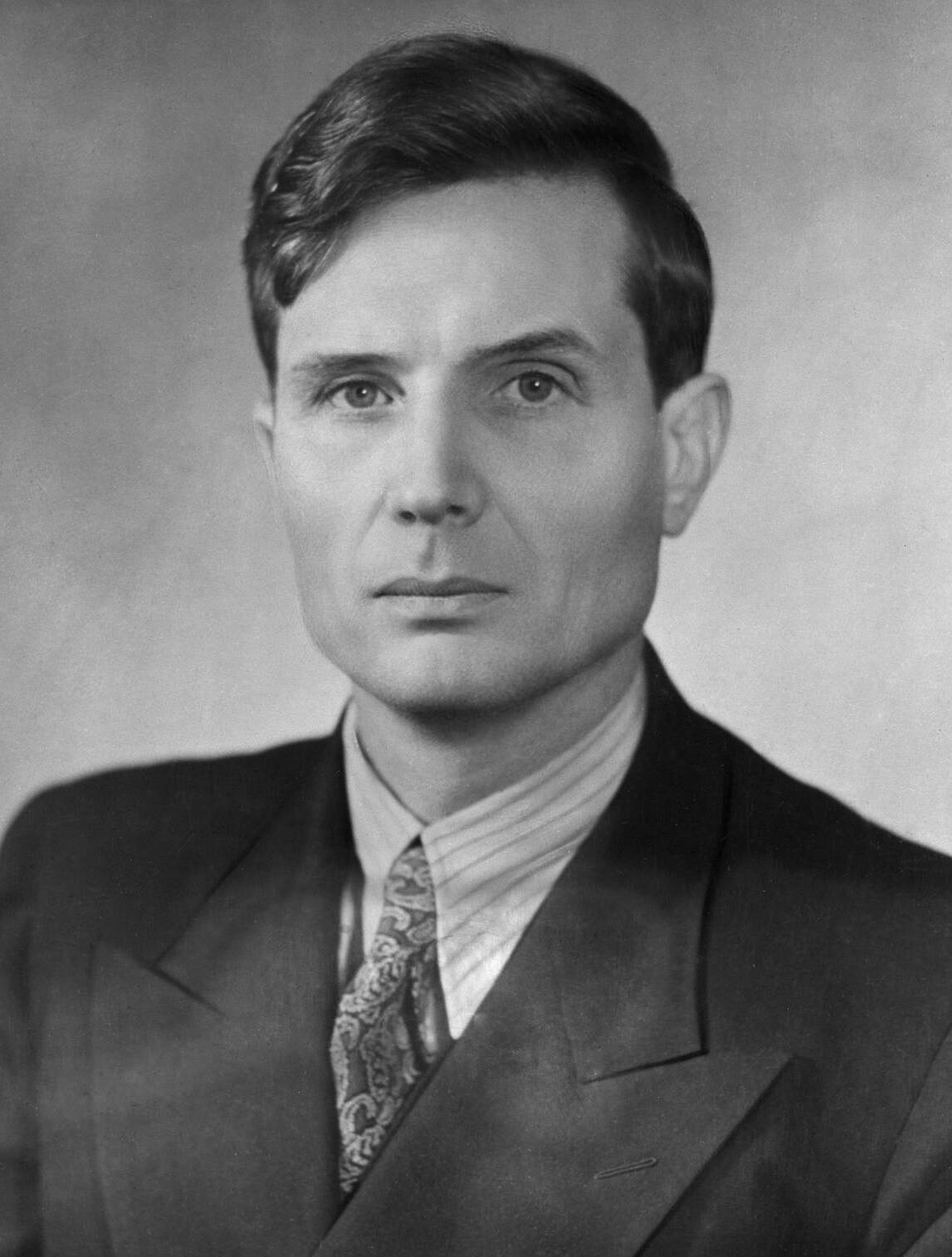
Mikhail Suslov

- Frank Hastings Brooke, 72, South African-born British Army officer
- Pierre Canivet, 91, French curler, tennis player, and Olympic medalist
- Kenneth Judson Cochrane, 85, Canadian politician
- Edwin B. Dooley, 76, member of the United States House of Representatives from New York
- Mildred Douglas Chrisman, 86, American trick rider, actress, and nurse
- John F. Fontron, 78, American lawyer and judge
- William Russel Huber, 78, United States Navy sailor and Medal of Honor recipient
- Gertrude Golda Lowy, 94, English suffragette
- Charlie Purdy, 76, New Zealand boxer
- Khan A Sabur, 73, Bangladeshi politician and lawyer
- Mikhail Suslov, 79, senior Soviet Communist Party official
- Garry Wheeler, 25, Australian rules footballer

=== 26 ===
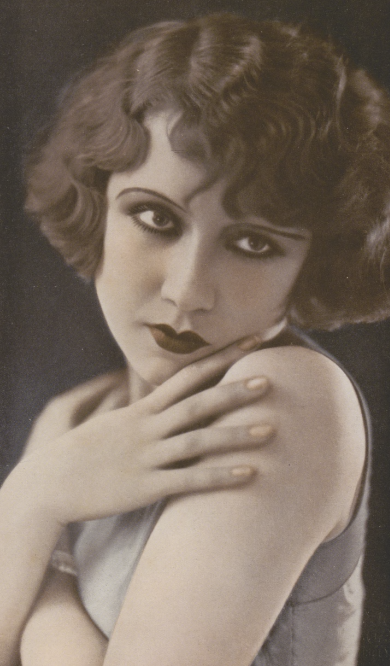
Nedda Francy

- Giancarlo Boriani, 87, Italian sports shooter and Olympian
- Jean Outland Chrysler, 60, American art collector
- Zehnder Confair, 76, American politician
- Nedda Francy, 73, Argentine stage and film actress
- Kenneth Kenafick, 77, Australian poet, writer, translator and anti-conscription campaigner
- Mollie Huston Lee, 75, American librarian
- Ginger Lees, British speedway rider
- Erosi Manjgaladze, 56, Soviet and Georgian stage and film actor
- Jack Owens, 69, American singer-songwriter
- Bill Schoech, 77, vice admiral in the United States Navy
- Isaiah Smithurst, 61, English cricketer
- Hans Jacob Ustvedt, 78, Norwegian medical doctor and broadcasting administrator

=== 27 ===
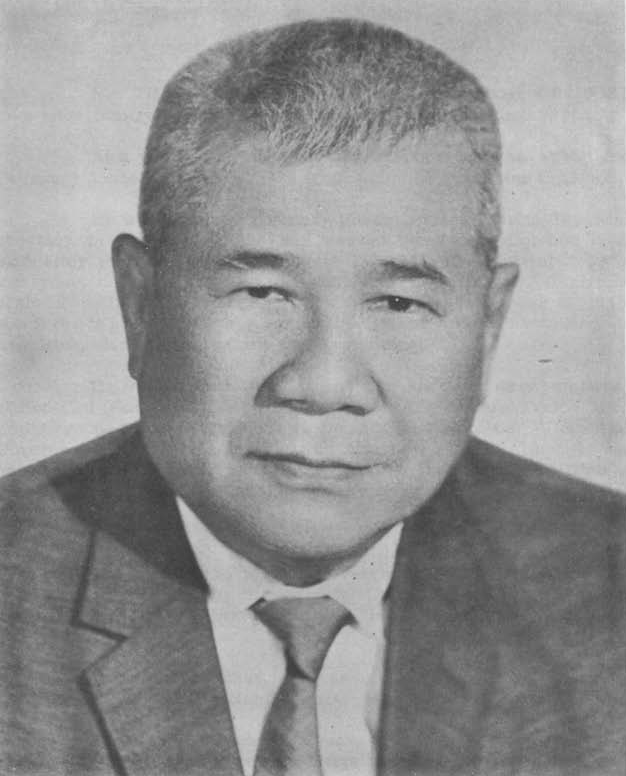
Trần Văn Hương

- Alexander Abusch, 79, German journalist, non-fiction writer, and politician
- Bill Carr, 80, British equestrian
- Daniel Sundén-Cullberg, 74, Swedish sailor and Olympian
- Alec Eist, 52, British detective for Scotland Yard
- Frank John William Goldsmith, 79, Titanic survivor and author
- Bill Haeffner, 87, American baseball player
- Per Holmström, 80, Swedish swimmer and Olympian
- Trần Văn Hương, 79, 3rd President of the Republic of Vietnam (South Vietnam) and 3rd Prime Minister of South Vietnam
- Bruno Kaiser, 70, Marxist scholar of German studies and journalist
- Francis E. Kelly, 78, American politician
- Félix Labisse, 76, French Surrealist painter, illustrator, and designer
- Han Langen, 72, Chinese actor
- Pleun van Leenen, 81, Dutch long-distance runner
- Guido Colonna di Paliano, 73, Italian diplomat and European Commissioner

=== 28 ===
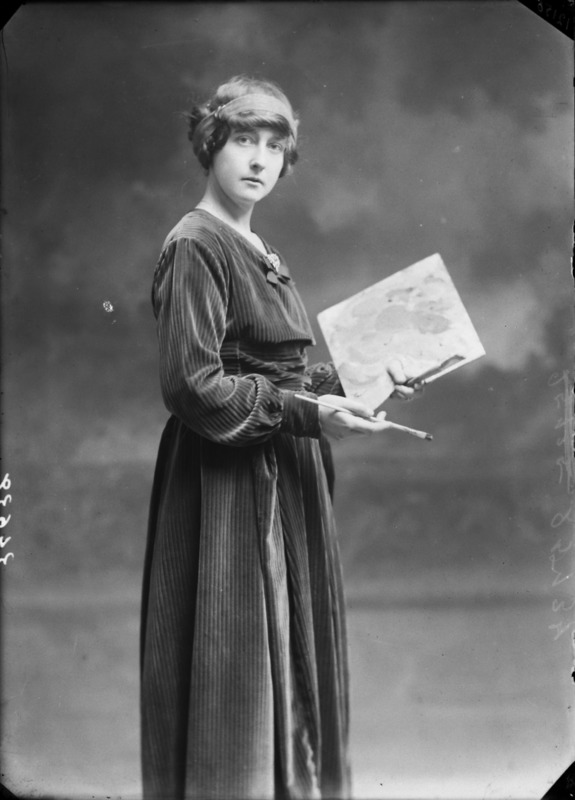
Élisabeth Chaplin

- Kemal Arıkan, 54, Turkish diplomat
- Andrea Buchanan, 26, American tennis player
- Élisabeth Chaplin, 91, French/Tuscan painter
- Marion Cunningham, 86, American baseball player
- Bert Etta Davis, 58, American alto saxophonist
- Mehmet Tevfik Gerçeker, 83 or 84, Turkish scholar
- Woodrow W. Keeble, 64, American military officer
- Jim Maloney, 80, Australian Labor politician and diplomat
- Des McKee, 58, Irish international rugby union player
- Veli Merikoski, 77, Finish politician and legal scholar
- Malcolm Moos, 65, American political scientist, speechwriter, and academic administrator
- Henry Peploski, 76, Polish baseball player
- Hub Pruett, 81, American baseball player
- Paul Schreiber, 79, American baseball player

=== 29 ===
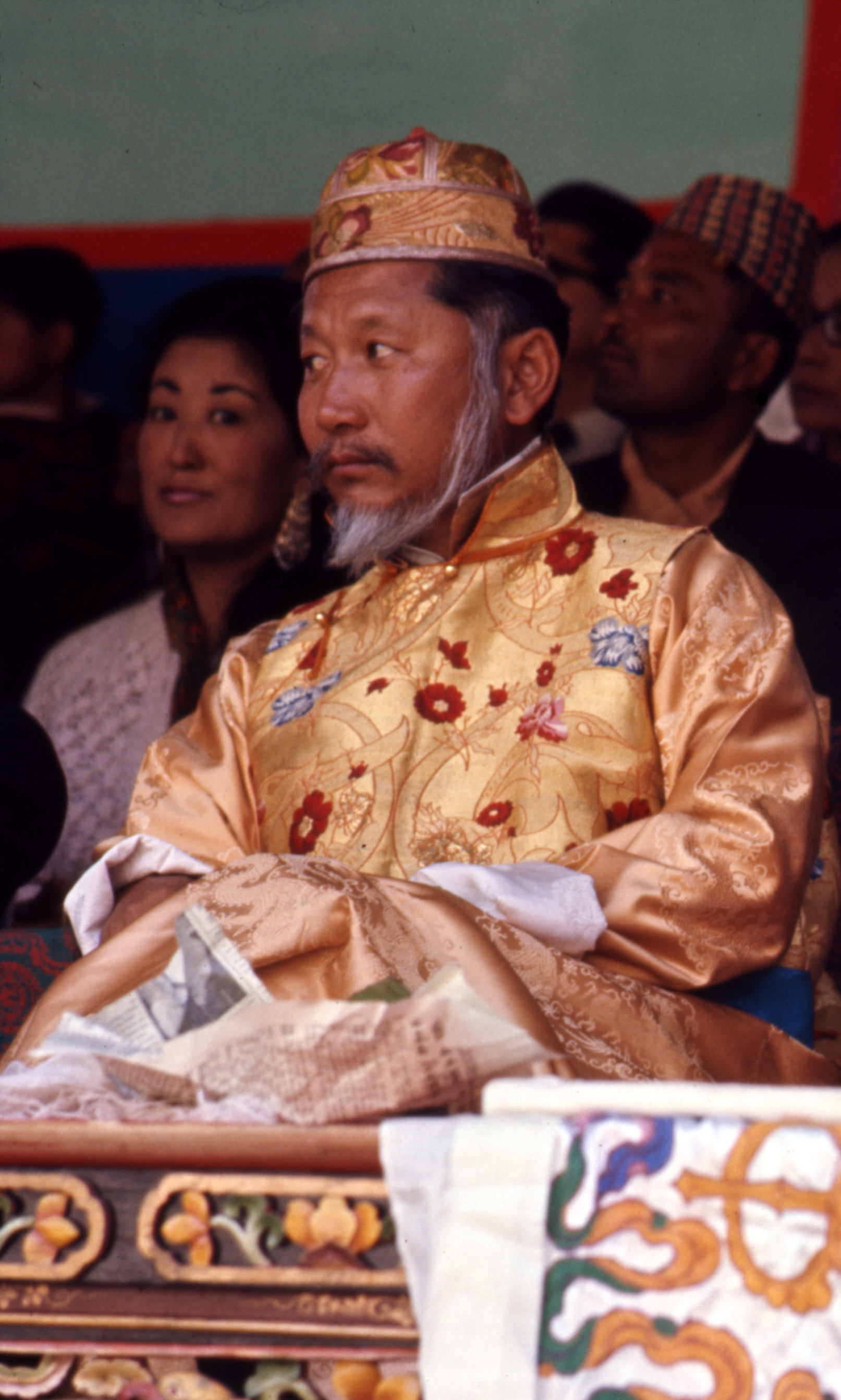
Palden Thondup Namgyal

- Gabriel Fabella, 83, Filipino historian
- Murtaza Ali Khan, 55, Nawab of Rampur
- John Liney, 69, American cartoonist
- John McKeague, Northern Irish loyalist
- Palden Thondup Namgyal, 58, King of Sikkim.
- Hironori Ōtsuka, 89, Japanese master of karate
- Rudolph Peters, 92, British biochemist
- Roger Stanier, 65, Canadian microbiologist
- Manoah Leide-Tedesco, 87, Italian-American composer, conductor and violinist

=== 30 ===
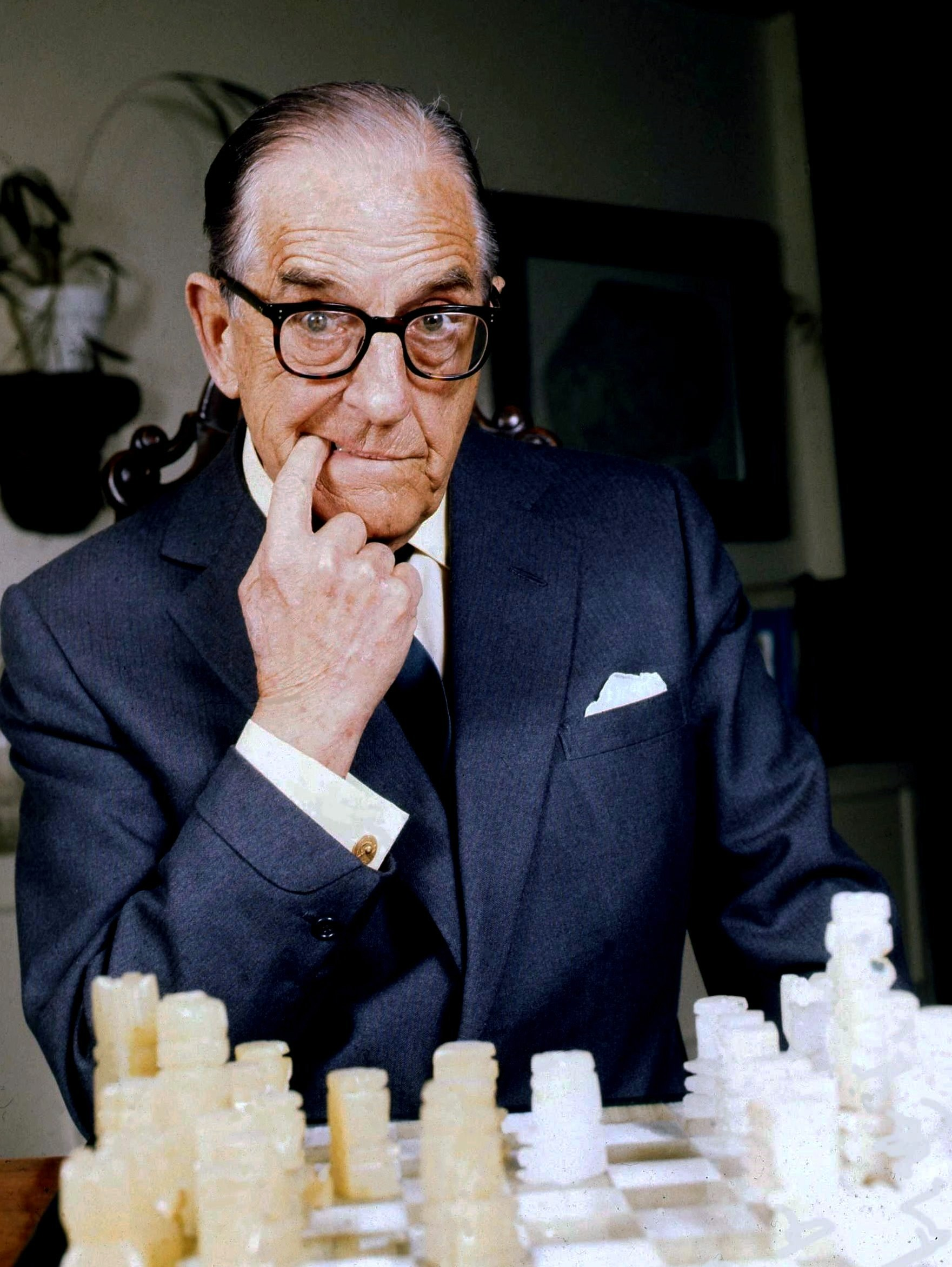
Stanley Holloway

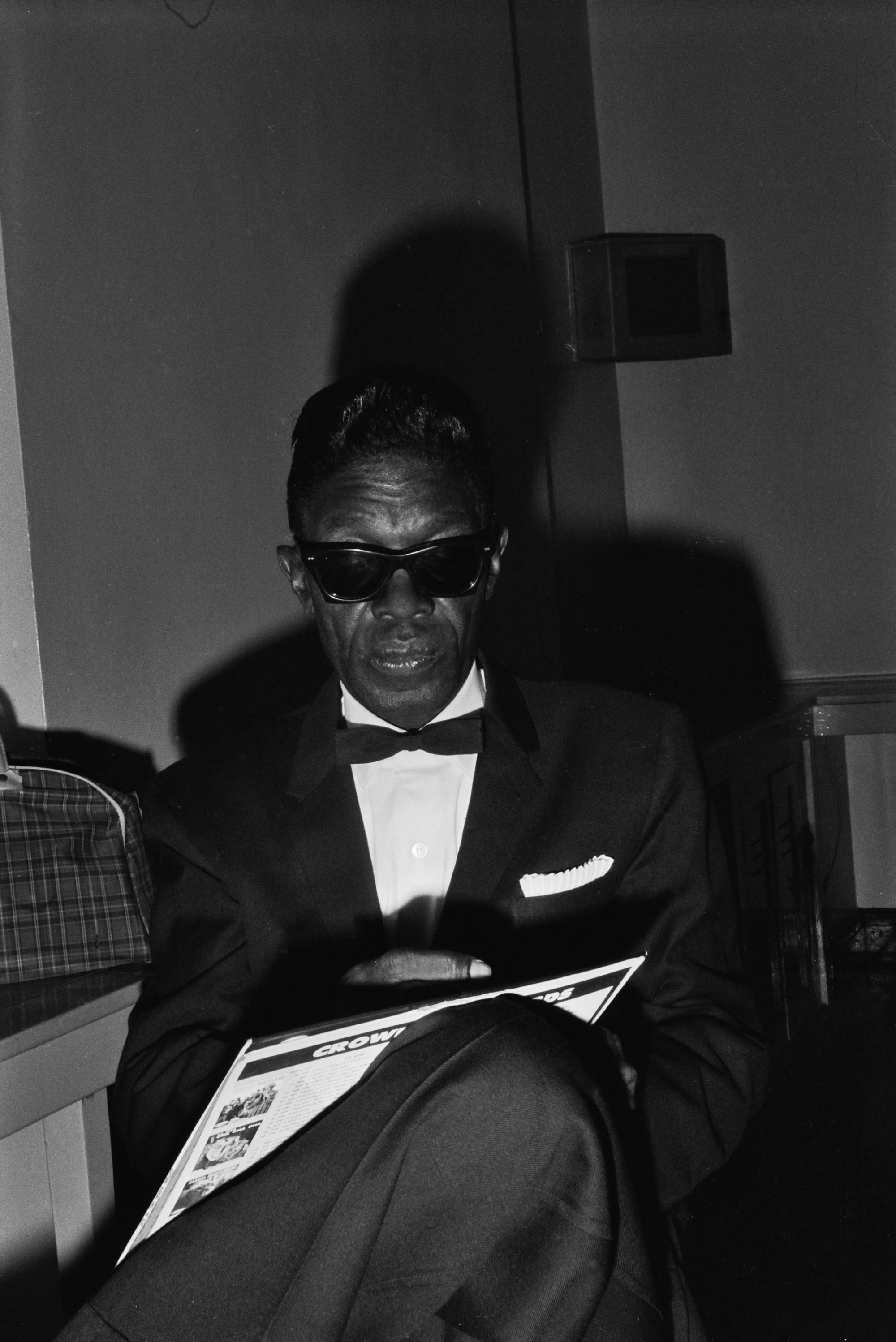
Lightnin' Hopkins

- Refaat Al-Gammal, 54, Egyptian intelligence officer
- Tora Dahl, 95, Swedish teacher and novelist
- Viggo Dibbern, 81, Danish gymnast
- Victor Glushkov, 58, Soviet computer scientist
- Stanley Holloway, 91, British actor
- Lightnin' Hopkins, 69, American blues musician
- Nilakanta Krishnan, 62, Indian Navy officer
- Helen Lynd, 85, American sociologist and philosopher
- Virginia Marshall, 63, American child actress
- Lluís Nonell, 55, Spanish actor
- Frances O'Connor, 67, American entertainer
- Hans Hermann Schaufuß, 88, German actor
- Ludwig Schmid-Wildy, 85, German actor

=== 31 ===
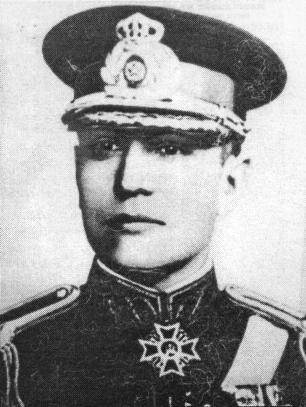
Gheorghe Mihail

- John Maxwell Anderson, Scottish consultant surgeon and cancer specialist
- Ritchie Calder, 75, Scottish socialist writer, journalist and academic
- Cyril Edward Gourley, 89, British Army officer and an English recipient of the Victoria Cross
- C. W. Grafton, 72, American crime novelist
- Len Maxwell, 75, Australian rules footballer
- Gheorghe Mihail, 94, Romanian career army officer
- Marvin Milkes, 58, American baseball executive
- Riccardo Nielsen, 73, Italian composer and music educator
- Florindo Sassone, 70, Argentine violinist and composer
- Wilfried Sätty, 42, German graphic artist
- Jiří Srnka, 74, Czech composer
- Aranka Szeiler, 72, Hungarian gymnast
- Agnes Sligh Turnbull, 93, American writer
