= Roy Westbrook =

Australian cricketer

Personal information
- Full name: Roy Austin Westbrook
- Born: 3 January 1889; Scottsdale, Tasmania, Australia
- Died: 7 August 1961 (aged 72); Wellington, New Zealand
- Batting: Right-handed
- Role: Batsman
- Relatives: Keith Westbrook (brother); Russell Westbrook (uncle)

Domestic team information
- Years: Team
- 1910/11–1913/14: Tasmania
- 1914/15–1921/22: Otago
- Source: CricInfo, 20 January 2016

Roy Austin Westbrook (3 January 1889 – 7 August 1961) was an Australian-born cricketer. He played three first-class matches for Tasmania between the 1910–11 and 1913–14 seasons and 11 matches in New Zealand for Otago between 1914–15 and 1921–22.

Westbrook was born at Scottsdale in Tasmania in 1889 and educated at Launceston Grammar School. He played cricket for teams representing the North of Tasmania from 1908 to 1909, as had a number of members of his extended family, before making his first-class debut for the Tasmanian team in 1910–11. On debut he made scores of 16 and 14 against the touring South African Test team in January 1911. He played twice more for the Tasmanian team, a 1911–12 match against Victoria and a 1913–14 match against New South Wales. Westbrook worked for the Union Steam Ship Company at Launceston and in early 1914 was transferred to work at the company's office at Dunedin in New Zealand.

After moving to Dunedin, where he played for the Carisbrook club, Westbrook played twice for the Otago representative team against Southland during the 1914–15 season. He did not play any further wartime cricket, but appeared in nine more first-class matches for the province between the 1918–19 and 1921–22 seasons, including playing against the touring Australians in 1920–21. In his 11 matches for Otago he scored 282 runs, with a highest score of 40. This was the second highest first-class score of his career―he had made 41 against Victoria in his second match for Tasmania.

During the 1921–22 season Westbrook left Dunedin and moved to Wellington where he played for the YMCA and Wellington clubs. He played with "consistently fine form" in club cricket and was considered one of the better batsmen in the Wellington area and a possibility for selection for the Wellington team in 1925–26. As late as 1929 he was being described as "a most reliable batsman", although in the event he did not win selection to the provincial team. He played into the 1930s and was a member of the Wellington club's committee.

Westbrook married Frances Hankinson in 1932. He died at Wellington in 1961 at the age of 72. His brother, Keith Westbrook, and uncle, Russell Westbrook, both played first-class cricket for Tasmania.
