= Śląski Kwartalnik Historyczny Sobótka =

History journal from Silesia

Silesian Historical Quarterly Sobótka
- Discipline: History
- Language: Czech; English; German; Polish
- Edited by: Tomasz Głowiński

Publication details
- Former name: Sobótka
- History: 1946-present
- Publisher: UWr Press; Szermierz Publishing House; (Poland)
- Frequency: Quarterly

Standard abbreviations
- ISO 4: Śl. Kwart. Hist. Sobótka

Indexing
- ISSN: 0037-7511 (print); 2658-2082 (web)

Links
- Journal homepage

The Śląski Kwartalnik Historyczny Sobótka (ŚKH Sobótka; transl. Silesian Historical Quarterly Sobótka) is a Central European scholarly journal that focuses on the history of the Silesian region.

== History ==
ŚKH Sobótka has been published since 1946, first as a semi-annual titled Sobótka, and since 1957 as a quarterly under its current title. The founder and first Editor-in-Chief was Professor Antoni Knot (1904–1982).

Until 2018, the journal was published by the Wrocław Society of History Enthusiasts (Wrocławskie Towarzystwo Miłośników Historii), which is the Wrocław chapter of the Polish Historical Society.

Since 2019, the journal has been published and owned by the University of Wrocław (UWr). Since 2024, its Editor-in-Chief has been Tomasz Głowiński, professor of the UWr.

== Aims and scope ==
ŚKH Sobótka is a scientific journal, which is an important place for the presentation of scientific views, discussions, and exchange of ideas. The journal is a well-established and recognizable periodical in the scientific communities of Poland, the Czech Republic, and Germany.

From its very beginning, ŚKH Sobótka was closely dedicated to research on the history of Silesia and its neighbouring regions. Importantly, the pages of the journal are also open to other topics, and the current editorial board wishes to maintain this tradition. Thus, ŚKH Sobótka publishes materials relating to research on the history of Central and Eastern Europe, albeit with particular emphasis on Silesia. In addition, each issue contains space for the so‑called 'universalia' — studies and historical materials of a different nature, unrelated to the main scope. The journal publishes texts Polish, Czech, English, and German. All articles published in ŚKH Sobótka are reviewed at least twice in accordance with the double blind principle.

The journal was awarded scientific merit points by the Polish Ministry of Science and Higher Education. It is also indexed in: Erih Plus, CEEOL, ICI Journals Master List, The Central European Journal of Social Sciences and Humanities (CEJSH), BazHum Science Library.

== See also ==
- Sobótka
