= Hugh Porter (disambiguation) =

Hugh Porter is an English cyclist.

Hugh Porter may also refer to:

- Hugh Porter (cricketer) (1911–1982), English cricketer
- Hugh Porter (poet) (1780–1839), Ulster Scots poet
- Hugh Porter (politician) (1843–1936), American politician in Wisconsin
