= Walbridge =

Walbridge or Wallbridge may refer to:

== Places ==
- Walbridge, Ohio, US
- Wallbridge, a community in the municipality of Quinte West, Ontario
- Wallbridge, Ontario, an unincorporated area in the Parry Sound District, Ontario
- Wallbridge, an area in the civil parish of Rodborough, England named for the historic Wallbridge across the Thames and Severn Canal

== People ==
- Walbridge A. Field (1833–1899), American lawyer, jurist, and politician
- Cyrus Walbridge (1849–1921), 28th mayor of St. Louis, Missouri (1893–1897)
- David S. Walbridge (1802–1868), U.S. Representative from Michigan
- Henry Sanford Walbridge (1801–1869), U.S. Representative from New York
- Hiram Walbridge (1821–1870), U.S. Representative from New York
- Larry Walbridge (1897–1982), American football player
