= Birgit Ståhl-Nyberg =

Swedish artist (1928–1982)

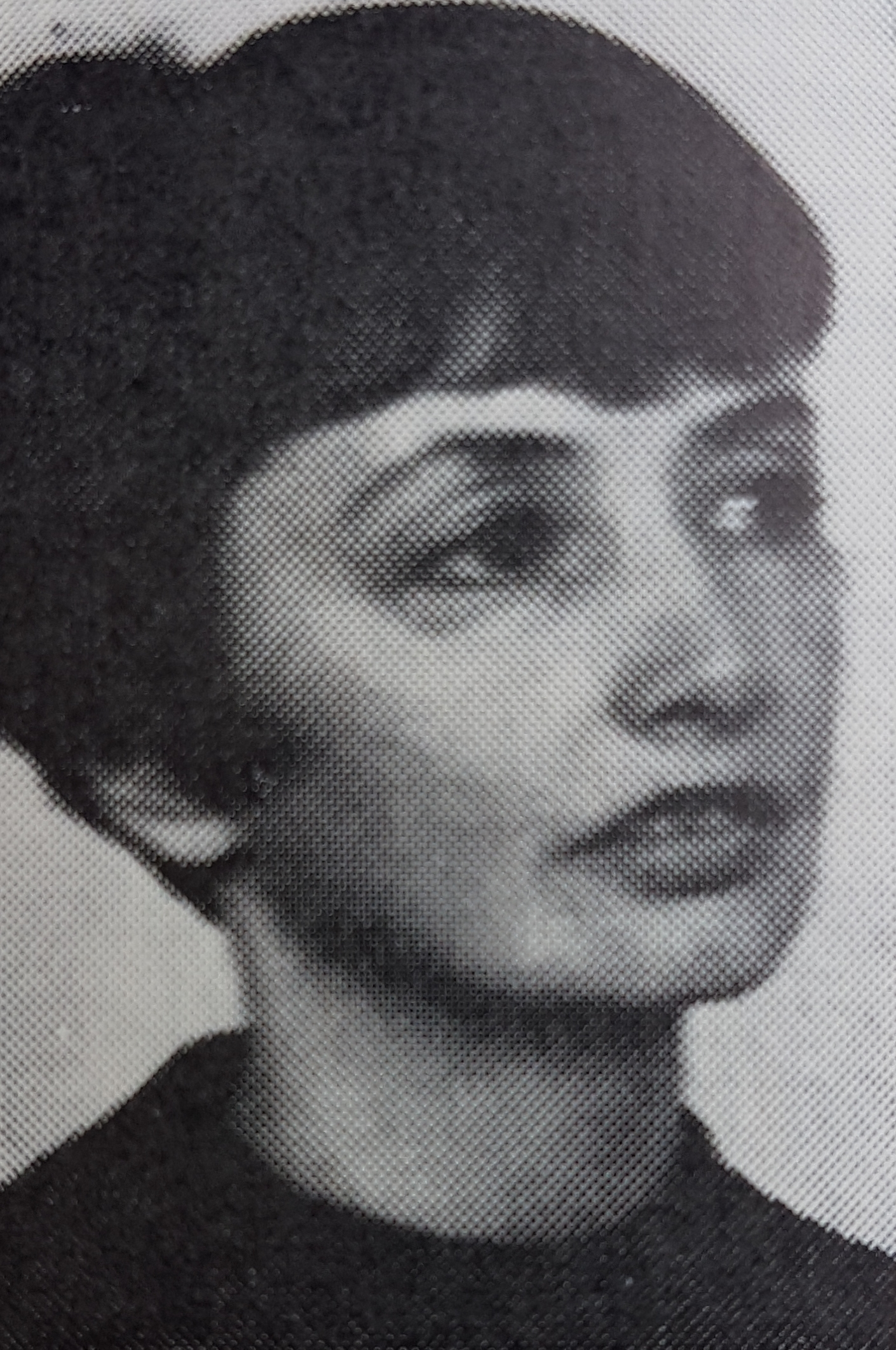
- Birgit Ståhl-Nyberg
- Born: Birgit Ellida Ståhl; 27 November 1928; Jämtland, Sweden
- Died: 20 January 1982 (aged 53); Stockholm, Sweden
- Occupation: Artist
- Spouse: Hendrik Nyberg

Birgit Ellida Ståhl-Nyberg (27 November 1928 – 20 January 1982) was a Swedish artist. She was known for her political art in the 1960s and the 1970s.

== Early life ==
Born in Jämtland, Sweden, Birgit Ståhl-Nyberg was the eldest of five daughters. She grew up in a nearby small town in Hammerdal. Her mother was Ida Jonsson, and her father, Elov Ståhl, was a member of the Swedish Social Democratic Party and the International Organisation of Good Templars, and was an accomplished fiddler and amateur painter. He was involved in the local workers' movement which led to the birth of the first local trade union- Swedish Forestry and Log-driving Workers' Association. Growing up, she was surrounded by theatre and musical groups which exerted an influence over her artistic life. She initially pursued a correspondence course in painting through the Nordiska korrespondensinstitutet. She became a student at a local public school, and in 1949, she attended the Otte Sköld's Art School. However, she soon had to return to Hammerdal where she enrolled in a distance learning programme.

Impressed by her artistic efforts, fellow artist Berta Hansson encouraged Ståhl-Nyberg to pursue art, and arranged a part-time job for her in Danderyd. During this time, Ståhl-Nyberg trained at the Académie Libre in Stockholm, under Lennart Rohde. In 1952, she subsequently became a student of the Royal Institute of Art (Konsthögskolan), where she was taught by Gothenburg-based illustrator Ragnar Sandberg. After graduating in 1958, she made trips to France and Mexico. At Konsthögskolan, she met fellow Finnish-Swedish painter Hendrik Nyberg, and they married.

== Artistic career ==
In 1961, Ståhl-Nyberg held her first exhibition at the Lilla Paviljongen in Stockholm, which included lively light-coloured compositions set in urban backdrops. Ståhl-Nyberg and her husband participated in the exhibition Fem målare i Östersund the following year, which featured her paintings Grön sommar and Blommande vas. In 1969, she collaborated with graphic artist Ingegerd Möller for an exhibition in Östersund. Among the many paintings that were displayed were Veckans affärer, Woman Power, and Rulltrappa, all of which employed contemporary themes. Eventually, underground carriages, banks, departmental stores, and suburbs became the subject of her paintings. Some of her works from this time showed that she used alienation, anonymity, and the cultural divide as her central themes. She made several studies on people taking escalators and travelling in carriages. She focused on interpreting the individuality of people . Her Tunnelbana in 1972 was painted after she had seen the people in real life. It shows a fatigued worker and his young son, sitting across a sophisticated lady inside an underground carriage. She added the woman to her composition after seeing her photo in a woman's magazine.

Ståhl-Nyberg's stylistic developments were heavily influenced by French Cubist artist Fernand Léger, and she frequently employed contrasting themes in her paintings. Her figurative paintings were depicted with thick and dark muscular contours, and included more than one perspective. In 1973, she painted Happy Boys – a painting which portrayed male figures moving fast towards the beholder. The figural style of males in her compositions showed them as active and they were often painted with their safety helmets and briefcases. In Det nya modet (1972), she painted a contrasting image of the fashion world with everyday lives, and Skyltfönster i Berlin (1981) featured two women dressed in white, dancing towards colourful mannequins. The latter recalled Picasso's compositions. Her paintings were often suggestive of social commentary, such as Sverige (1974), and population decline, such as Erik Escha, Resta, and Logen Ede skans finns inte längre. She also worked on ceramic compositions during the 1970s. Examples include Arbetsgemenskap, Dans, Kvinnans ideal, and Kvinnans vardag. Between 1971 and 1975, she worked on the interpretations of the working environment, producing paintings of the porcelain factory Gustavsbergs Porslinsfabrik. During this time, she also created posters under the Society for the Promotion of Art) and the Department of the Protection of Workers.

While working as a teacher at the Department of Fine Arts at Konstfack, Ståhl-Nyberg collaborated on an anthology Bildanalys which analysed compositions from a societal perspective. Works by Ståhl-Nyberg have appeared in many significant exhibitions including the Svenska Konstnärinnor Exhibition, Kvinnfolk, and Vi slåss för livet. She held her last solo exhibition at the Galleri Doktor Glas in Stockholm in 1982.

== Later years ==
Ståhl-Nyberg died in Stockholm, on 20 January 1982.
