= J.C. Moore =

J.C. Moore can refer to:

- J.C. Moore (coach), American college football coach from the early 20th century
- J.C. Moore (politician), American state legislator from Kansas
