= Berta Hansson =

Swedish artist & educator (1910–1994)

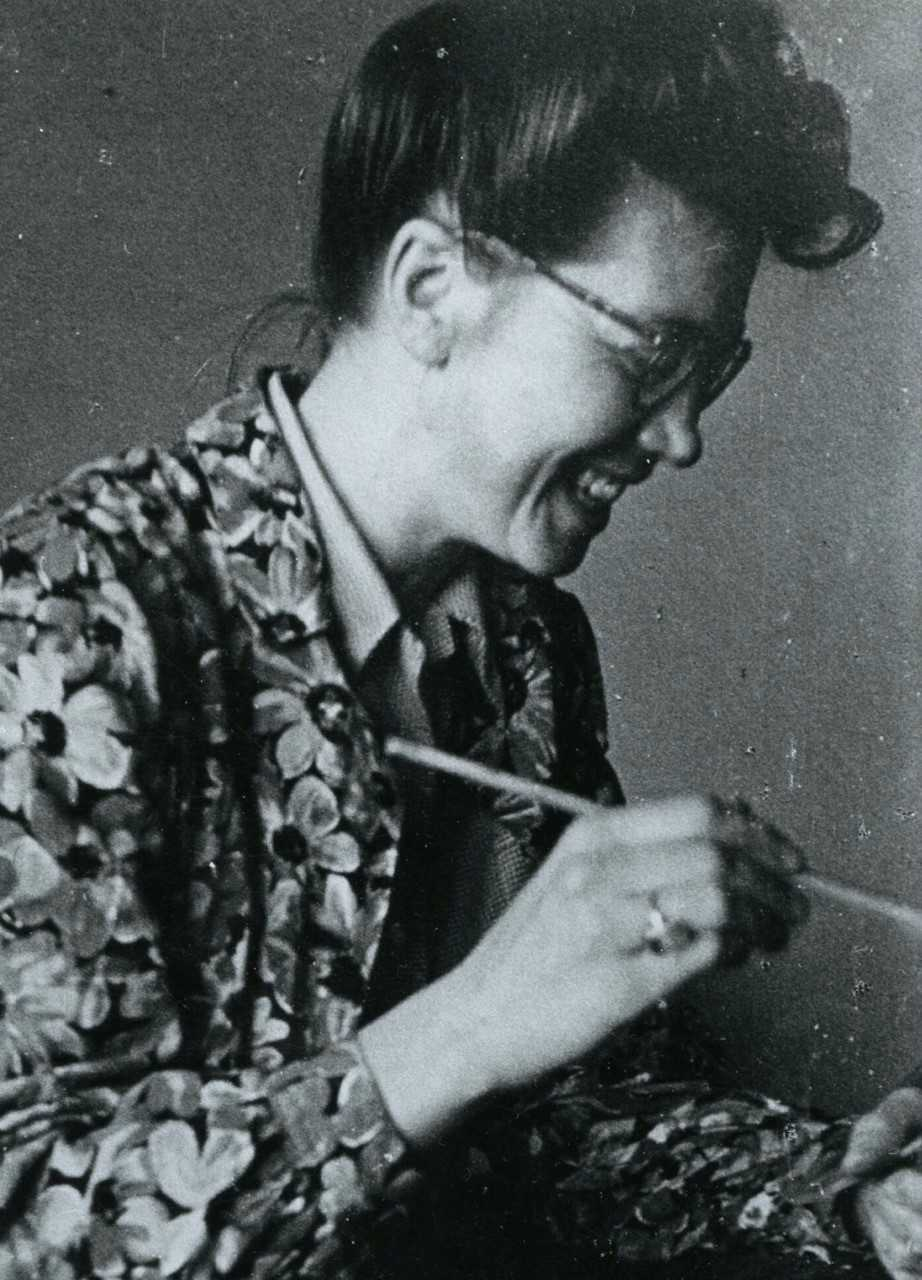
Berta Hansson (late 1940s)

Berta Elisabet Hansson (1910–1994) was a Swedish artist and educator. She is remembered as one of the country's most prominent Expressionists, especially for her depictions of children. After first working as a schoolteacher, in 1940 she attended Otte Skölds Art School (now Pernby School of Painting) and started to paint. Impressed by her work, the writer and artist Elsa Björkman-Goldschmidt arranged a solo exhibition for her in 1943. Thanks to the interest of her reviewers, she soon became a full-time artist. In the 1950s, she spent a year in South Africa where she was upset by the conditions imposed on black people. On returning to Sweden she expressed her anti-apartheid feelings in artworks and textiles. Later in life, she turned to sculpture, creating portraits of children in terracotta and bronze. Her works can be seen in several Swedish museums including Nationalmuseet and Moderna Museet.

== Biography ==
Born in Hammerdal, Jämtland County, on 23 June 1910, Berta Elisabet Hansson was the daughter of the farmer Daniel Hansson and his wife Brita. After the death of her mother and elder sister, Berta persuaded her father to allow her to attend the high school in Sigtuna where her subjects included art, literature and philosophy. Thereafter, she studied teacher training in Umeå, earning her diploma in 1934.

She spent the next ten years as a schoolteacher in the village of Fredrika in the far north of Sweden. Whenever possible, she incorporated drawing in her lessons. Among her most successful works are her drawings of Fredrika children. In 1938, while on a teaching trip to Linköping, she met the painter Leoo Verde who encouraged her to use paints. Two years later, she studied painting under Brita Nordencreutz (1899–1982) and took a summer course at Otte Sköld's painting school in Stockholm (now Pernby School of Painting).

In the early 1940s, while in Fredrika the writer and artist Elsa Björkman-Goldschmidt discovered Hansson's paintings and arranged a solo exhibition for her in Stockholm in 1943. The reviewers were impressed by the originality and sensitivity of the unknown artist, although some maintained her paintings of children were caricatures.

In the post-war years, Hansson was able to make trips to France, Italy and Egypt. In 1953, she spent a year in a Swedish mission station in South Africa where she developed an art programme for schools in KwaZulu-Natal. Particularly concerned about the conditions for the black population, she depicted her feelings in her art, including in textiles, her growing interest. Not only did she produce large textile works for public display but in the 1970s began to sculpt children's portraits in terracotta and bronze. In her later years, she painted her mental images of birds in black and white as she was no longer able to distinguish colours. As an Expressionist, she has been compared to Siri Derkert and Vera Nilsson.

Berta Hansson died in Stockholm on 3 September 1994.
