= Norman Westbrook =

Australian cricketer

Personal information
- Born: 25 June 1868; Launceston, Tasmania, Australia
- Died: 29 May 1931 (aged 62); Launceston, Tasmania, Australia

Domestic team information
- Years: Team
- 1893-1909: Tasmania
- Source: Cricinfo, 16 January 2016

Norman Westbrook (25 June 1868 – 29 May 1931) was an Australian cricketer. He played six first-class matches for Tasmania between 1893 and 1909.

== See also ==
- List of Tasmanian representative cricketers
