= Kenny Starke =

South African rugby union player

- Full name: Kenneth Thomas Starke
- Born: 18 June 1900 Muldersvlei, South Africa
- Died: 3 January 1982 (aged 81)
- Height: 1.74 m (5 ft 9 in)
- Weight: 64.1 kg (141 lb)
- School: Paul Roos Gymnasium

Rugby union career
- Position: Wing three–quarter
Provincial / State sides
Years	Team	Apps	(Points)
- Western Province
International career
Years	Team	Apps	(Points)
1924	South Africa	4	(13)

Kenneth Thomas Starke (18 June 1900 – 3 January 1982) was a South African international rugby union player.

Starke was born in Muldersvlei and attended Paul Roos Gymnasium.

A lightly built wing three–quarter, Starke was known for his agility and sidestep abilities. He featured on the left wing for the Springboks in all four home internationals against the 1924 British Lions. This included a match at Newlands, where he scored two tries and a long range drop goal, to set a national individual points record.

== See also ==
- List of South Africa national rugby union players
