= Douglas Cox (cricketer) =

Australian cricketer (1919–1982)

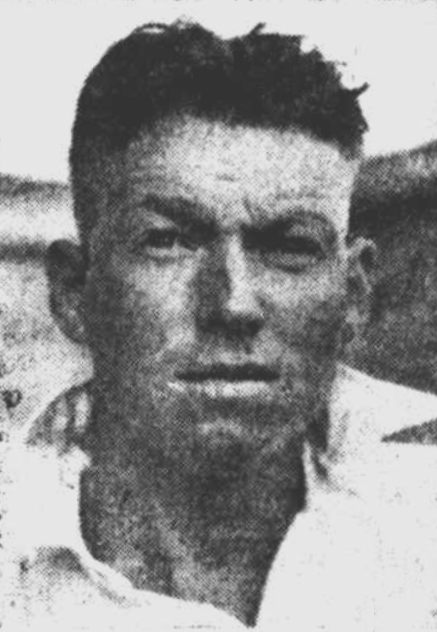

Personal information
- Born: 9 July 1919; West End, Queensland, Australia
- Died: 9 January 1982 (aged 62); Dakabin, Queensland, Australia
- Source: Cricinfo, 1 October 2020

Douglas Cox (9 July 1919 – 9 January 1982) was an Australian cricketer. He played in one first-class match for Queensland in 1940/41.

Cox began his cricket career in 1935, playing D-grade warehouse cricket as an all-rounder. He considered focusing on batting but ultimately decided to focus on becoming a fast bowler. In 1940, he made his first grade debut for Toombul and he took 11 wickets at an average of 9.45 in his first three games which earned him selection in a Queensland practice side from which the state team was to be selected in October 1940.

In December 1940, a local paper noted that Cox had underperformed in the practice squad but argued that he was a superior bowler to other candidates and that the fact he was a better batsman than other potential bowlers made him a suitable candidate for the state side. He was selected for Queensland in late December and made his First-class debut against New South Wales in Sydney, taking 3 for 63 and 0 for 73 in the match.

While he did not represent the state again, Cox continued playing grade cricket until at least 1946. As of 1949, he had moved to Caloundra and was playing cricket for its team which did not have district status. However, he argued, Caloundra was the equal of any Brisbane side, inviting Brisbane clubs to play the team.

== See also ==
- List of Queensland first-class cricketers
