= Humberto Salvador =

Ecuadorian writer, lawyer, and psychoanalyst

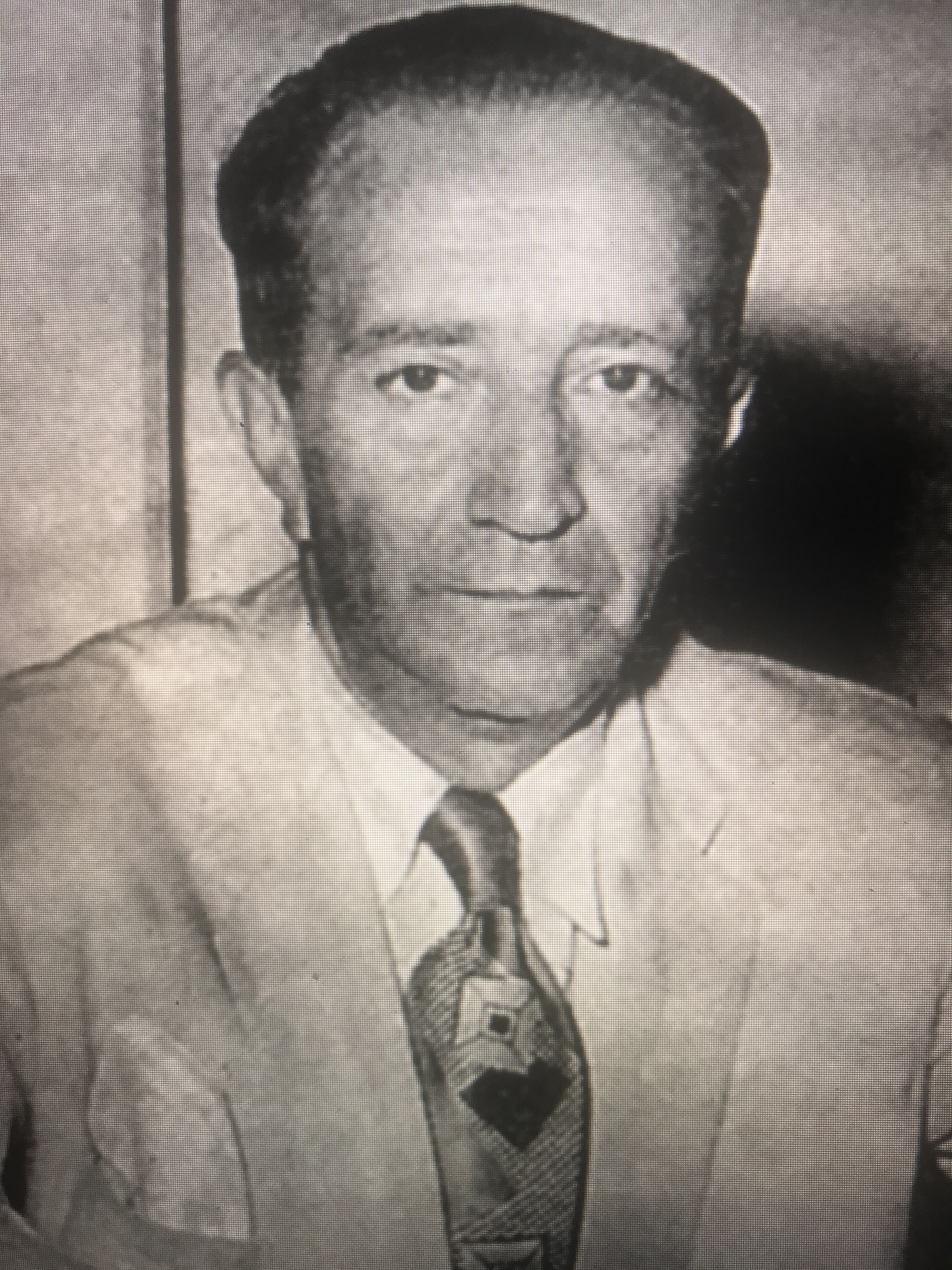
- Born: December 25, 1909; Guayaquil, Ecuador
- Died: January 17, 1982 (aged 72)
- Education: Doctor of Juridical Sciences
- Alma mater: Central University of Ecuador Instituto Nacional Mejía
- Occupation(s): Lawyer, writer, psychoanalyst, and short story writer

Humberto Salvador Guerra (Guayaquil, 25 December 1909 – ibid., 17 January 1982) was an Ecuadorian writer, lawyer, and psychoanalyst. In his early works, he was—alongside Pablo Palacio—a representative of the avant-garde movement in Ecuador, publishing books such as En la ciudad he perdido una novela... (1930). His writing later shifted toward the trend of social realism.

== Biography ==
He was born on 25 December 1909 in Guayaquil, Guayas Province. At a young age he lost both parents and moved to the home of an aunt in Quito. He completed his secondary studies at the Instituto Nacional Mejía, where he was a classmate of writer Jorge Icaza, and pursued higher education at the Central University of Ecuador, studying law while working as a literature teacher at the Instituto Mejía.

During his last years of school and early university years, he joined leftist political groups. His first writings appeared in magazines such as América, Llamarada, and the newspaper El Día. In 1925 he founded, together with Jorge Icaza, the magazine Claridad, which published four issues; he also wrote the plays Canciones de rosa and Amor prohibido, which use comedy to portray the Quito bourgeoisie of the time.

Salvador’s avant-garde phase began in 1929 with the publication of his short story collection Ajedrez. The stories are influenced by Freudian theories and depict characters with psychiatric and sexual obsessions. The collection includes the story La navaja, which won awards in Colombia and Argentina. The following year he published two additional avant-garde works: the novel En la ciudad he perdido una novela…, which after his death came to be regarded as one of his most notable books, and the short story collection Taza de té.

In 1933, he adopted a more realist and naturalist style with the novel Camarada, which received international critical acclaim. He later published two more works in this vein: Trabajadores (1935) and Noviembre (1939). The latter was a commercial success, amplified by rumors that Salvador had received death threats for his depiction of the dictatorship of Federico Páez.

In the early 1950s, he moved to Guayaquil and married Professor Violeta Vallejo Arrieta. He later worked as a teacher at the Colegio Rita Lecumberri, where he eventually became principal, and at the University of Guayaquil.

== Thought ==
Humberto Salvador was an admirer and promoter of the ideas of Austrian physician Sigmund Freud. His essay Esquema sexual, published in 1933 by Ercilla in Chile, and written as his doctoral thesis at the Central University of Ecuador, was described as “the gospel of Ecuadorian Freudianism” by writer and journalist Alejandro Carrión. Over the years, the work gained significant success, with its sixth edition reaching a print run of 10,000 copies.

One of the ideas he defends in Esquema sexual is his opposition to the criminalization of homosexuality in Ecuador, which at the time was classified as a crime under Article 364 of the Criminal code and carried a prison sentence of four to eight years. To justify his position, Salvador analyzed the subject from clinical and scientific perspectives, concluding that maintaining homosexuality as a crime was incorrect. He also pointed out the contradiction that only male homosexuality was prohibited, suggesting that perhaps the authors of the Criminal Code felt attraction to their own sex and that “therefore, repression—in Freudian terms—took on in them traits of maximum violence.” He added: “It has been said that those who most harshly attack a sexual deviation are those who practice it or secretly desire it. And this is an evident psychological truth.”

== Works ==
The extensive bibliography of Humberto Salvador includes the following:

=== Novels ===
- En la ciudad he perdido un novela... (1930)
- Camarada (1933)
- Trabajadores (1935)
- Noviembre (1939)
- La novela interrumpida (1942)
- Prometeo (1943)
- Universidad Central (1944)
- La fuente clara (1946)
- Silueta de una dama (1964)
- La elegía del recuerdo (1966)
- Viaje a lo desconocido (1967)
- La extraña fascinación (1970)
- La ráfaga de angustia (1971)

=== Short stories ===
- Ajedrez (1929)
- Taza de té (1930)
- La lírica resurrección (1967)
- Sacrificio (1978)

=== Other ===
- Canciones de rosas (1925), theatre
- Amor prohibido (1925), theatre
- Esquema sexual (1933), essay
