= James Grimshaw (cricketer) =

English cricketer

Personal information
- Full name: James William Travers Grimshaw
- Born: 17 February 1912; Darlington, County Durham, England
- Died: 26 September 1944 (aged 32); Nijmegen, Netherlands
- Batting: Right-handed
- Bowling: Slow left-arm orthodox
- Role: Bowler

Domestic team information
- Years: Team
- 1932–1935: Cambridge University
- 1934: Kent
- 1936: Marylebone Cricket Club (MCC)
- FC debut: 11 May 1932 Cambridge University v Yorkshire
- Last FC: 29 August 1936 Marylebone Cricket Club (MCC) v Kent

Career statistics
Competition	First-class
Matches	26
Runs scored	355
Batting average	13.65
100s/50s	0/0
Top score	40
Balls bowled	5,176
Wickets	65
Bowling average	27.07
5 wickets in innings	1
10 wickets in match	0
Best bowling	5/92
Catches/stumpings	19/–
- Source: ESPNcricinfo, 9 March 2017

James William Travers Grimshaw (17 February 1912 – 26 September 1944) was an English cricketer who played first-class cricket between 1932 and 1936. Grimshaw was born in Darlington, County Durham in 1912 and attended King William's College on the Isle of Man before going up to Cambridge University. He gained a cricket Blue and played for the university cricket team, making his debut in the 1932 season.

Grimshaw played 29 first-class cricket matches in his career, playing mainly for his University in the 1934 and 1935 seasons. He played two matches for Kent County Cricket Club in 1934 and appeared for Marylebone Cricket Club (MCC) in 1936. He was a slow left-arm orthodox bowler who took 65 wickets in his career.

Grimshaw served in the Royal Artillery as a Warrant Officer during World War II. He was a member of 86 Heavy Anti-Aircraft Regiment of the Honourable Artillery Company before transferring to 275 Battery, 165 Heavy Anti-Aircraft Regiment. He rose to the rank of Battery Sergeant Major. He was killed in action on 29 September 1944 at Nijmegen in the Netherlands at the end of Operation Market Garden. Grimshaw is buried at the Jonkerbos war cemetery in the town.

== Bibliography ==
- Carlaw, Derek (2020). Kent County Cricketers, A to Z: Part Two (1919–1939) (PDF). Cardiff: ACS.
