= Ivana Lang =

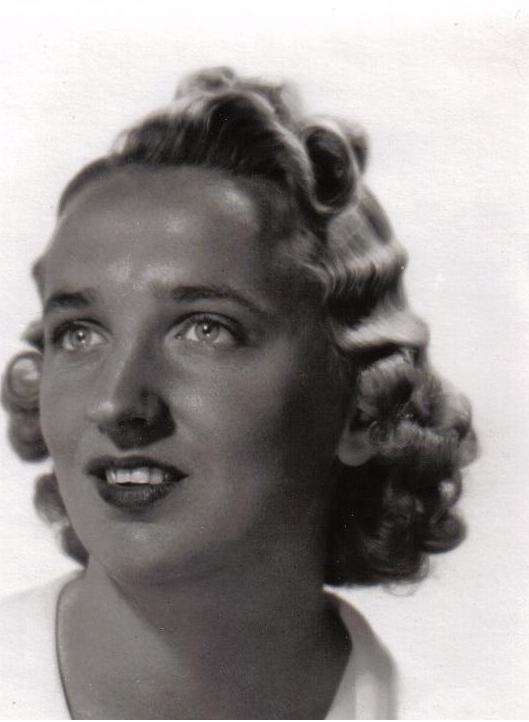
- Born: 15 November 1912; Zagreb, Austro-Hungarian monarchy, (now Croatia)
- Died: 2 January 1982 (aged 69); Zagreb, SFR Yugoslavia
- Education: University of Zagreb
- Occupations: Composer, pianist

Ivana Lang (15 November 1912 – 2 January 1982) was a Croatian composer, pianist and piano teacher. She was born in Zagreb, Croatia, Austro-Hungarian Empire). She completed piano studies in 1937 at the Music Academy in Zagreb. Ivana Lang composed orchestral works (concert for piano and orchestra), chamber music, an opera ("The Captain of Kastav", Croatian: Kastavski kapetan) and two ballets, "False Knight" (Lažni vitez) and "Dance of the Ghosts" (Ples sablasti).

== Biography ==
Ivana Lang-Beck was born into a respectable family from Zagreb. Her father, Dr Arthur Lang was a prominent physician. He was the doctor at the Croatian National Theatre. Her mother Margaretha (born Leitgebel) was an academic painter, specialising in ceramics.

In 1937 Ivana acquired a degree in classical piano at the Zagreb Academy of Music. In addition to piano studies, she attended classes and composition studies with Prof. Milo Cipra.

Upon completion of studies at the Music Academy in 1937 she left her hometown of Zagreb in order to broaden and refine her study of composition with Joseph Marx at the Mozarteum in Salzburg. During her training with Joseph Marx she had the opportunity to explore European musical traditions and contemporary trends.

Among her famous work was composing music to poems written by Dragutin Domjanić and Antun Gustav Matoš.

Ivana Lang had married at the age of 37 to Marjan Beck, with whom she had one child.

== Body of work ==
Lang's body of work, consisting of 110 opus numbers, is based on original folk music, especially from Istria. Her work is considered a development, filtration, and stylisation of the original songs. She first directed her attention to lyricism, before the focusing on the arrangement of instrumental dance music.

== Works (selection) ==
- Agnus Dei for soprano and chamber ensemble Op 15 (1942)
- Melodramas for voice and piano, Op 21 (1942)
- Grotesque, for symphony orchestra Op 11 (1942)
- Concerto for piano and orchestra Op 22 (1944)
- The Silent Shadows, ballet in 3 acts Op 52 (1959)
- To a Nameless One, four-song cycle for mezzo-soprano and piano Op 75 (1970)
- Four Bagatelles for piano Op 59 (1962)
- Four Bagatelles for harp and strings Op 86 (1974)
- Four Compositions for piano Op 50 (1961)
- The Black Olive, song cycle of five songs for dramatic soprano and piano Op 49 (1959)
- Two Songs by Domjanić for voice and piano Op 17 (1942)
- Two Istrian Songs from Pazin for female choir and piano Op 39 (1952)
- The Dance of the Black People, ballet act with piano accompaniment Op 36 (1950)

== See also ==
- Music of Croatia
