= Les Laver =

Australian rules footballer, born 1900

Personal information
- Full name: Leslie Frederick Laver
- Born: 9 December 1900; Clifton Hill, Victoria
- Died: 9 January 1982 (aged 81); Geelong, Victoria
- Original team: Hampton
- Debut: Round 6, 1926, Geelong vs. Richmond, at Punt Road Oval
- Height: 173 cm (5 ft 8 in)
- Weight: 76 kg (168 lb)

Playing career^{1}
Years	Club	Games (Goals)
1926, 1928, 1931–32	Geelong	8 (0)

Coaching career
Years	Club	Games (W–L–D)
1940	Geelong	2 (1–1–0)
- ^{1} Playing statistics correct to the end of 1932.

Leslie Frederick Laver (9 December 1900 – 9 January 1982) was an Australian rules footballer who played with Geelong in the VFL during the late 1920s and early 1930s.

After five games in his debut season, Laver managed just three more appearances for Geelong, each in different seasons. In the 1940 VFL season he stepped in as caretaker coach of Geelong when Reg Hickey was unavailable and steered them to a win over Footscray and loss to Essendon. In his playing career he had never experienced a loss, playing in winning sides in all but one of his games, the other was drawn. Hickey and Laver had made their VFL debuts in the same match in 1926.
