= Hermann Czirniok =

German politician (1903–1982)

Mayor of Szczecin
- In office 1934–1934
- Preceded by: Erich Mix
- Succeeded by: Werner Faber (as the high mayor)

Member of the Landtag of Prussia
- In office 1932–1933

Personal details
- Born: 23 December 1903 Hamburg, German Empire (now part of Germany)
- Died: 3 January 1982 (aged 78) Großhansdorf, West Germany (now part of Germany)
- Party: National Socialist German Workers' Party
- Occupation: Politician

Hermann Richard Paul Czirniok (23 December 1903 – 3 January 1982) was a politician and a member of the National Socialist German Workers' Party in Nazi Germany. From 1932 to 1933 he was a member of the Landtag of Prussia, and in 1934, a mayor of Szczecin (now located in Poland).

== Biography ==
Hermann Czirniok was born on 23 December 1903 in Hamburg, German Empire. After graduating from a primary school, he had completed an apprenticeship as a confectioner, attended a business school, and later worked as a confectioner's assistant.

On 16 October 1925 Czirniok had joined the National Socialist German Workers' Party, and later become a chairperson of the local party division in Szczecin. In 1929 he became a member of the city council, and the chairperson of the party parliamentary group. In 1930 Czirniok became party district leader (Kreisleiter). In October 1932, he and other party members were arrested for inciting a riot during a party convention in Słupsk. From 1932 to 1933 he was a member of the Landtag of Prussia. In 1934 Czirniok was a mayor of Szczecin, until the office was disestablished, and its functions merged with the role of the high mayor. During the 1936 elections, he unsuccessfully run for office of a member of the Reichstag (the national parliament).

Czirniok died on 3 January 1982 in Großhansdorf, Schleswig-Holstein, West Germany.
