= Hugh Porter (cricketer) =

English cricketer

Personal information
- Full name: Hugh Lachlan Porter
- Born: 25 January 1911; Kensington, London
- Died: 8 January 1982 (aged 70); Ealing, Middlesex
- Batting: Right-handed
- Bowling: Right-arm slow

Domestic team information
- Years: Team
- 1934–1949: Suffolk
- 1935: Minor Counties

Career statistics
Competition	First-class
Matches	2
Runs scored	42
Batting average	21.00
100s/50s	0/0
Top score	38
Catches/stumpings	0/–
- Source: Cricinfo, 12 August 2012

Hugh Lachlan Porter (25 January 1911 – 8 January 1982) was an English cricketer. Porter was a right-handed batsman who bowled right-arm slow. He was born at Kensington in London.

Porter made his debut for Suffolk County Cricket Club against Lincolnshire in the 1934 Minor Counties Championship. Prior to the start of World War II in 1939, Porter made 32 appearances for Suffolk in the Minor Counties Championship. Playing minor counties cricket for Suffolk allowed him to be selected to play for a combined Minor Counties cricket team, who he made his first-class debut for against Cambridge University at Fenner's in 1935. The Minor Counties won the toss and elected to bat first, making 195 all out, with Porter being dismissed for 38 runs by Jahangir Khan. Cambridge University then made 163 all out in their first-innings, to which the Minor Counties responded in their second-innings by making 144 all out, with Porter being dismissed for 4 runs by James Grimshaw. Set a target of 177 for victory, Cambridge University reached their target with four wickets to spare. He made a second first-class appearance for the team in 1935 against Oxford University at the University Parks. Oxford University won the toss and elected to bat first, reaching 169/4. With the match heavily impacted by poor weather, this was the only innings possible during the match, which ended as a draw.

Following World War II, Porter returned to play minor counties cricket for Suffolk, making an additional 21 appearances, the last of which came against Bedfordshire in 1949. He later served as the President of Suffolk County Cricket Club from 1967 to 1969. In September 1939, he married Barbara Mary, with the couple having five children. He died at Ealing, Middlesex, on 8 January 1982.
