= Stan Biggs =

Australian rules footballer

Personal information
- Full name: Stan Biggs
- Born: 11 March 1935
- Died: 18 January 1982 (aged 46)
- Original team: McKinnon
- Height: 178 cm (5 ft 10 in)
- Weight: 71 kg (157 lb)

Playing career^{1}
| Years | Club | Games (Goals) |
| 1956 | South Melbourne | 2 (0) |
- ^{1} Playing statistics correct to the end of 1956.

Stan Biggs (11 March 1935 – 18 January 1982) was an Australian rules footballer who played with South Melbourne in the Victorian Football League (VFL).
