= Francis W. Kelly =

American Catholic military chaplain (1910–1982)

The Reverend Monsignor Francis W. Kelly
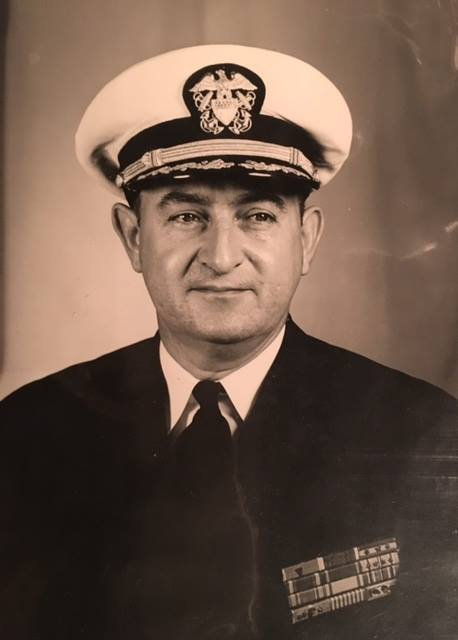
- Kelly in his Navy uniform
- Born: 16 October 1910; Philadelphia, Pennsylvania, U.S.
- Died: 9 January 1982 (aged 71); Oceanside, California, U.S.
- Burial place: Arlington National Cemetery (Note: Site E-226-B1)
- Military career
- Allegiance: United States
- Branch: United States Navy
- Service years: 1941–1946; 1950–1969
- Nicknames: "Father Foxhole" "Foxhole Kelly" "Bum Dope Kelly"
- Units: 1st Marine Division; 2nd Marine Division; 5th Marine Division
- Conflicts: World War II: Guadalcanal Campaign; Battle of Tarawa (WIA); Battle of Iwo Jima; Battle of Okinawa; Korean War
- Awards: Legion of Merit; Purple Heart; Presidential Unit Citation
- Church: Catholic (Latin Church)

Orders
- Ordination: 22 May 1937 (priesthood) by Dennis Joseph Dougherty
- Rank: Prelate of Honour of His Holiness (1969)

Francis William Kelly (16 October 1910 – 9 January 1982) was an American Catholic priest who served as a chaplain during World War II, embedded in the Pacific Theater with the U.S. Marines. Kelly was present at Guadalcanal, Tarawa, Okinawa and Iwo Jima; his presence on front lines earned him his nicknames, including "Father Foxhole" and "Foxhole Kelly". He was featured in the wartime book Guadalcanal Diary and a fictionalized version of him appeared in the subsequent film. After a brief period in parochial assignments after World War II ended, he re-entered active duty during the Korean War and remained as an active chaplain until his retirement in 1969.

== Early life ==
Francis Kelly was born to Rebecca Neal in Philadelphia on 16 October 1910. He grew up in the Irish Corktown neighborhood of Philadelphia and attended St. Agatha parochial school. For priestly formation, he attended St. Charles Borromeo Seminary in Overbrook, Pennsylvania. Kelly was ordained to the priesthood for the Archdiocese of Philadelphia by Cardinal Joseph Dougherty on 22 May 1937. He was initially assigned to St. Canicus parish in Philadelphia as the parochial vicar before being reassigned of St. Charles Borromeo Church in Upper Darby in 1939.

== Military career ==
While driving back from a West Catholic High School football game on 7 December 1941, Kelly and a friend listened to the accounts of the Attack on Pearl Harbor. Kelly slammed his fist on the dashboard and vowed to enlist. In early 1942, he was commissioned as a Navy Chaplain and assigned to the 1st and 2nd Marine Divisions.

Present at many of the bloodiest battles of the Pacific Theater during World War II, Kelly's time as a chaplain was marked by an insistence on being on the front lines. Kelly's first major deployment was the Guadalcanal campaign. Journalist Richard Tregaskis accompanied the Marine Corps; Tregaskis' resulting book, Guadalcanal Diary, featured Kelly. In the subsequent film, the fictional character of Father Donnelly played by Preston Foster was based on Kelly.

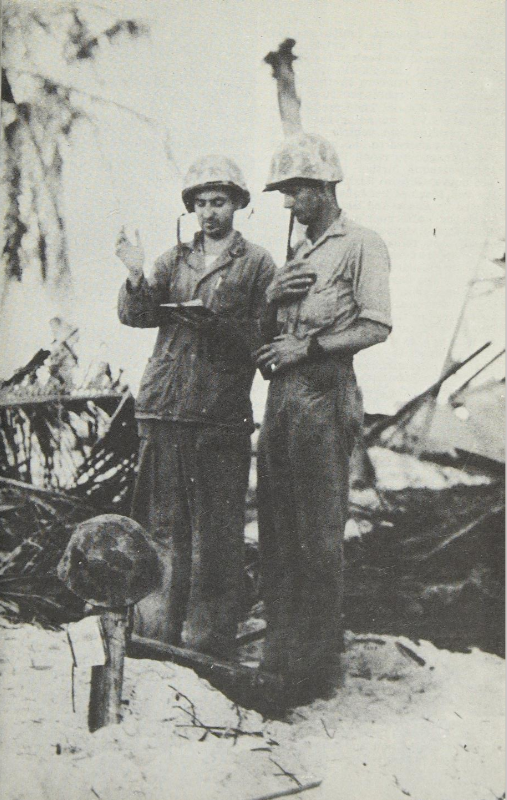
Kelly and an assistant performing burial rites at Tarawa

The night before the Marine landings at the Battle of Tarawa, Kelly said Mass on board his ship and distributed communion to the Marines. Storming the beach alongside troops the next morning, Kelly administered last rites to those grievously injured. For those already dead, he dug a cemetery with the assistance of other personnel. In the course of the battle his left leg was struck by shrapnel, which earned him a Purple Heart.

Kelly also stormed the beaches with the Marines in the battles of Okinawa and Iwo Jima. The Marines of his division became so accustomed to seeing him that they nicknamed him "Father Foxhole" or "Foxhole Kelly". Kelly once remarked that perhaps the Marines noticed his "faculty for flying through the air and landing comfortably in a hole". He was also known as "Bum Dope Kelly" for his habit of telling "far-fetched stories" to improve the morale among his Marines.

After World War II, Kelly remained in the Navy Reserves while serving at St. Robert's Roman Catholic Church in Chester, Pennsylvania, and St. Helena's Church in Philadelphia. At the outbreak of the Korean War in 1950, Kelly reentered active duty and was assigned to the 1st Marine Division. Kelly's assignments included Naval Station Rota in Spain and Naval Submarine Base New London in Connecticut. In 1967, he expressed interest in being deployed to Vietnam prior to his retirement. He remained in the service until 1969, also serving as chaplain for the 5th Marine Division and the 4th Naval District.

On 18 February 1969, Kelly was named a monsignor by Pope Paul VI, with the rank Prelate of Honour of His Holiness. After briefly serving at St. Patrick's in Philadelphia, he returned to chaplaincy in service at Camp Pendleton in 1971.

== Later life ==
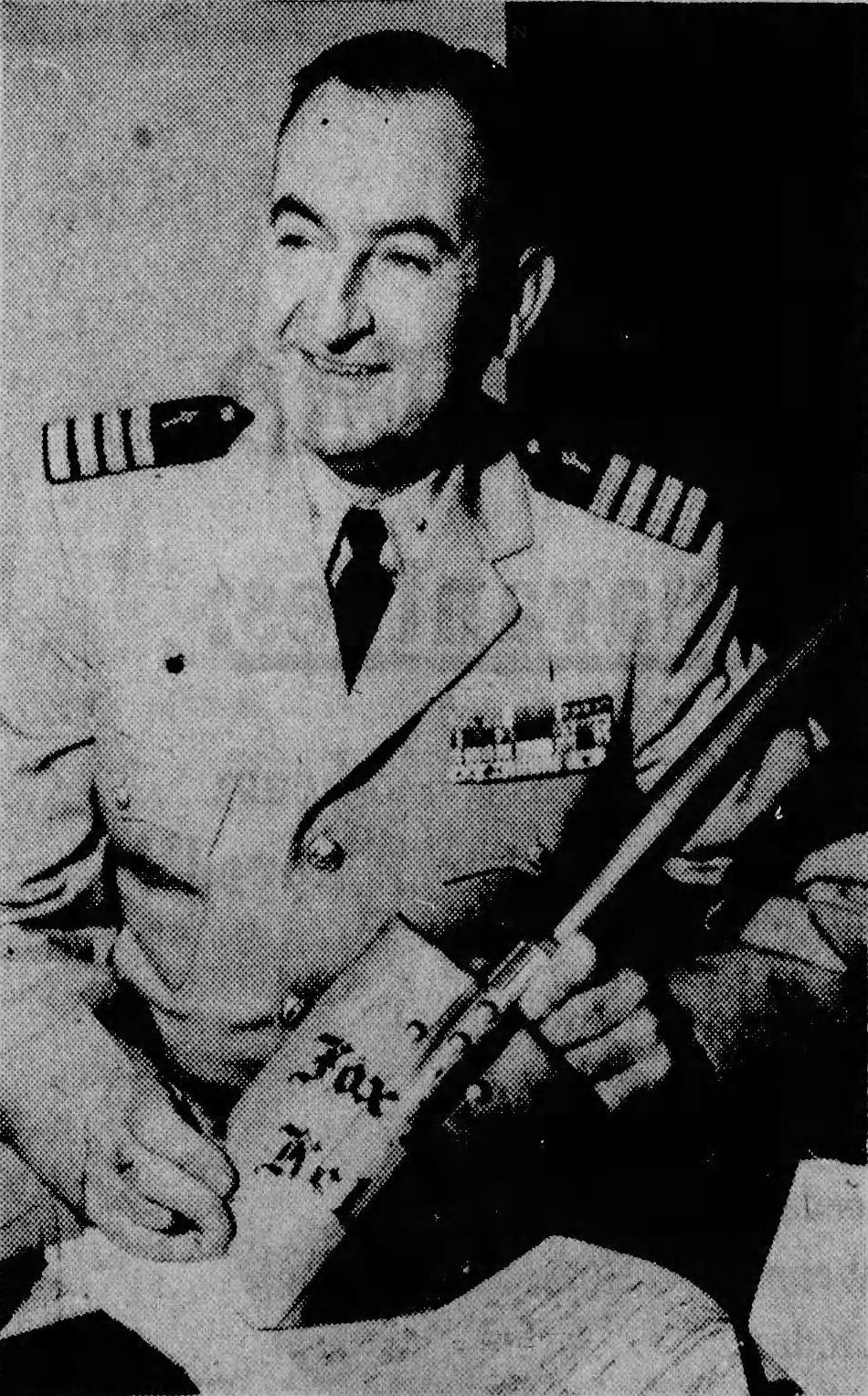
Kelly holding a commemorative shovel with "Foxhole Kelly" written on it

Kelly was well known in the Philadelphia sports community, and was a lifelong fan of the Eagles and Phillies. He blessed Veterans Stadium before it opened in 1971. He was named "Citizen of the Year" by Oceanside, California, in 1976. In his later years, he also assisted at St. John the Evangelist Catholic Church in Encinitas.

Kelly died on 9 January 1982, at Tri-City Hospital in Oceanside. His body was flown back to Philadelphia, where Cardinal Krol presided at his funeral on 15 January at the Cathedral Basilica of Saints Peter and Paul. He was buried in Arlington National Cemetery.

== Awards and decorations ==
Kelly was awarded the following medals and citations:

Purple Heart
Legion of Merit
Presidential Unit Citation
Presidential Unit Citation (South Korea)
Asiatic–Pacific Campaign Medal
American Campaign Medal
Korean Service Medal
China Service Medal
United Nations Medal
