= Isaiah Smithurst =

English cricketer (1920–1982)

Personal information
- Full name: Isaiah Smithurst
- Born: 6 November 1920; Eastwood, Nottinghamshire, England
- Died: 26 January 1982 (aged 61); Giltbrook, Nottinghamshire, England
- Batting: Left-handed
- Bowling: Slow left-arm orthodox

Domestic team information
- Years: Team
- 1946: Nottinghamshire

Career statistics
Competition	First-class
Matches	1
Runs scored	1
Batting average	0.50
100s/50s	–/–
Top score	1
Balls bowled	37
Wickets	–
Bowling average	–
5 wickets in innings	–
10 wickets in match	–
Best bowling	–
Catches/stumpings	–/–
- Source: Cricinfo, 3 October 2010

Isaiah Smithurst (6 November 1920 – 26 January 1982) was an English cricketer. Smithurst was a left-handed batsman who bowled slow left-arm orthodox. He was born in Eastwood, Nottinghamshire.

Smithurst made a single first-class appearance for Nottinghamshire against Gloucestershire in 1946 County Championship. During his only first-class match, he scored 1 run and was dismissed for a duck in Nottinghamshire's first innings, leaving him a batting average of 0.50.

He died at Giltbrook, Nottinghamshire on 26 January 1982.
