= Hammerdal =

- Location within Jämtland Location within Sweden
- Coordinates: 63°35′N 15°21′E
- Country: Sweden
- Province: Jämtland
- County: Jämtland County
- Municipality: Strömsund Municipality

Area
  - Total: 2.29 km^{2} (0.88 sq mi)

Population (31 December 2010)
  - Total: 974
  - Density: 425/km^{2} (1,100/sq mi)
- Time zone: UTC+1 (CET)
  - Summer (DST): UTC+2 (CEST)

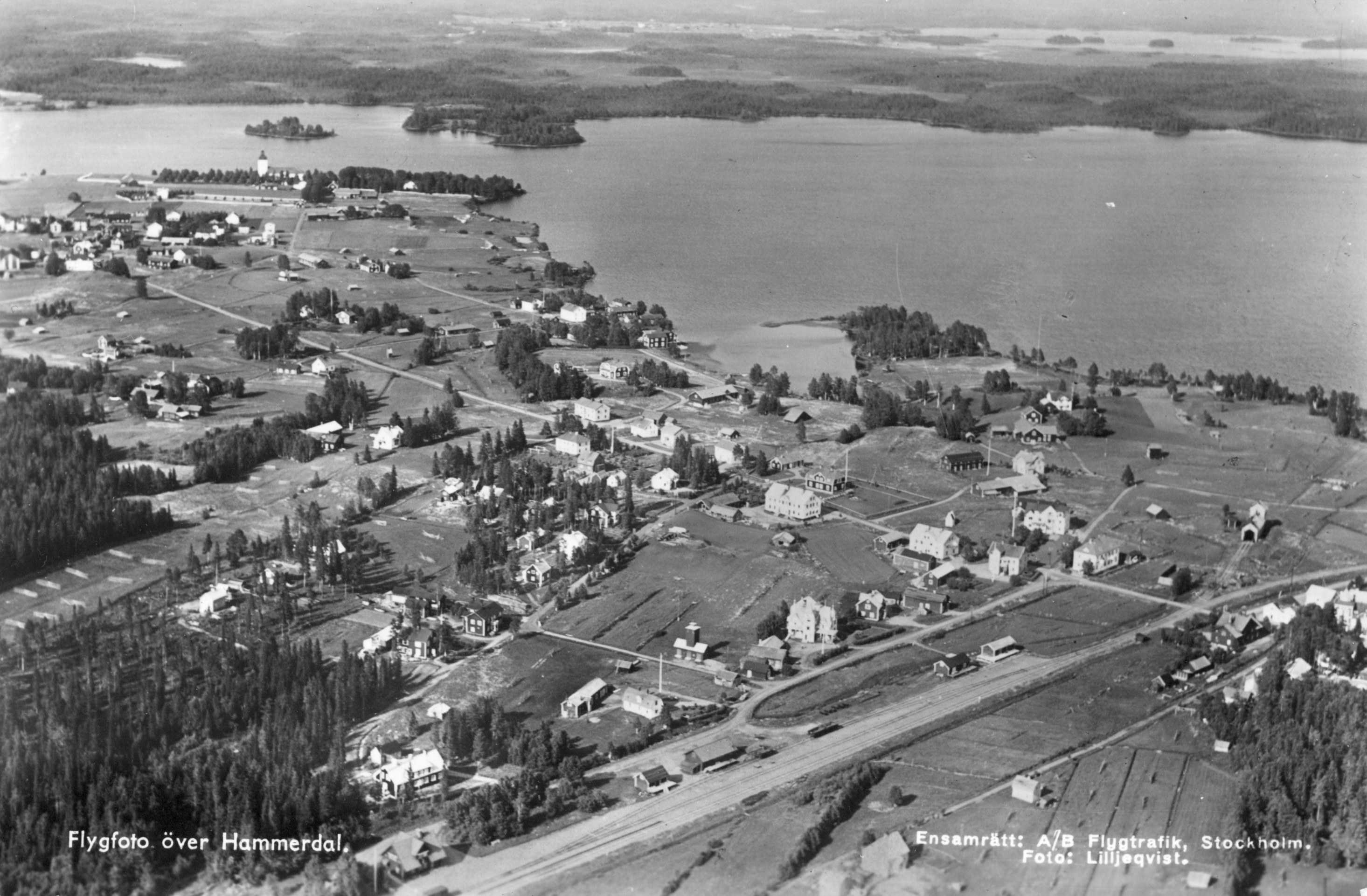
Hammerdal (1930)

Hammerdal (Swedish pronunciation: [ˈhâmːɛˌɖɑːl]) is a locality in Strömsund Municipality, Jämtland County, Sweden. It had 974 inhabitants in 2010. It is historically associated with Hammond, Louisiana, USA, by way of a Swedish immigrant who founded the Louisiana city.
