= Antoni Knot =

Polish scholar, historian, librarian and teacher

Antoni Knot (born 1904, died 2 January 1982 in Wrocław) was a Polish scholar, historian, librarian and teacher. In 1929 he gained Ph.D. in philosophy at the University of Lwów. In 1965 he became professor (profesor zwyczajny).

From 1947 to 1949 Knot was the chief librarian of Ossolineum.
