= Larry Walbridge =

American football player (1897–1982)

No. 15
- Position: Center

Personal information
- Born: September 11, 1897; Wellsboro, Pennsylvania, U.S.
- Died: January 11, 1982 (aged 84); Woodland Hills, California, U.S.
- Listed height: 5 ft 7 in (1.70 m)
- Listed weight: 200 lb (91 kg)

Career information
- High school: Indiana (Indiana, Pennsylvania)
- College: Fordham

Career history
- New York Giants (1925)
- Stats at Pro Football Reference

Lyman Norman "Larry" Walbridge (September 11, 1897 – January 11, 1982) was an American professional football center who played one season with the New York Giants of the National Football League (NFL). He played college football at Mansfield Normal School and Fordham University.

== Early life and college ==
Lyman Norman Walbridge was born on September 11, 1897, in Wellsboro, Pennsylvania. He attended Indiana High School in Indiana, Pennsylvania.

Walbridge played college football at Mansfield Normal School, earning a letter at guard in 1916. He then served in the United States Navy. In September 1919, it was reported that he was enrolled at Lafayette College. However, it does not appear that he played football there. Walbridge was then a member of the Fordham Rams of Fordham University from 1920 to 1923, and a letterman in 1920, 1921, and 1923.

== Professional career ==
Walbridge played in two games for the New York Giants of the National Football League during the team's inaugural 1925 season. He wore jersey number 15 while with the Giants. He stood 5'7" and weighed 200 pounds.

== Personal life ==
Walbridge died on January 11, 1982, in Woodland Hills, California.
