= Keith Westbrook =

Australian cricketer

Personal information
- Born: 28 May 1887; Scottsdale, Tasmania, Australia
- Died: 20 January 1982 (aged 94); Burnie, Tasmania, Australia

Domestic team information
- Years: Team
- 1909/10: Tasmania
- Source: Cricinfo, 19 January 2016

Keith Raymond Westbrook (28 May 1887 – 20 January 1982) was an Australian cricketer. He was a right-handed batsman and right-arm bowler who played for Tasmania. He was born in Scottsdale and died in Burnie.

Westbrook made a single first-class appearance for the team, during the 1909–10 season, against Victoria. From the lower order, he scored 35 runs in the first innings in which he batted, and 25 runs in the second. Westbrook had figures of 0-51 from 16 overs of bowling.

His uncle and his brother also played first-class cricket for Tasmania.

== See also ==
- List of Tasmanian representative cricketers
