= John Calvin Moore =

American football coach

Biographical details
- Born: October 13, 1900; Tarrant County, Texas, U.S.
- Died: January 15, 1982 (aged 81); Fort Worth, Texas, U.S.
- Education: North Texas State University

Coaching career (HC unless noted)
- 1925–1932: North Texas Aggies

Administrative career (AD unless noted)
- 1925–1933: North Texas Aggies

Head coaching record
- Overall: 41–29–4

John Calvin Moore (October 13, 1900 – January 15, 1982) was an American college football coach, teacher, court clerk, and television host. He was the fourth head football at North Texas Agricultural College—now known as the University of Texas at Arlington—serving for eight seasons, from 1925 to 1932, and compiling a record of 41–29–4.

Moore attended Northside High School and North Texas State University. From 1934 to 1942, he was the clerk of the 17th District Court in Tarrant County, Texas. From 1942 to 1954, Moore worked for General Dynamics, as a supervisor in education and labor relations. He also served as a substitute physical education teacher. Moore was the host of Bewely Barndance and Hoffman Hayloft Party, which aired in the early days of KXAS-TV in Fort Worth, Texas. He died on January 15, 1982.

== Head coaching record ==
Year	Team	Overall	Conference	Standing	Bowl/playoffs
North Texas Aggies () (1925–1932)
1925	North Texas Aggies	4–5			
1926	North Texas Aggies	6–3			
1927	North Texas Aggies	9–1			
1928	North Texas Aggies	7–3			
1929	North Texas Aggies	4–4			
1930	North Texas Aggies	6–1–3			
1931	North Texas Aggies	2–6–1			
1932	North Texas Aggies	3–6			
North Texas Aggies:		41–29–4			
Total:		41–29–4			
