= January 1982 =

Month of 1982

<<	January 1982					>>
Su	Mo	Tu	We	Th	Fr	Sa
					1	2
3	4	5	6	7	8	9
10	11	12	13	14	15	16
17	18	19	20	21	22	23
24	25	26	27	28	29	30
31

The following events occurred in January 1982:

== January 1, 1982 (Friday) ==
- Javier Pérez de Cuéllar of Peru, took office for a five-year term as the fifth Secretary-General of the United Nations, succeeding Kurt Waldheim of Austria. On the same day, the nations of Togo, Zaire, Jordan, Guyana and Poland became the new non-permanent members of the UN Security Council to begin a two-year term and replacing Niger, Tunisia, the Philippines, Mexico and East Germany.
- After the 1980 launch of Cable News Network, a second cable television network, CNN2, began telecasting, originally as a format of national news shown live every 30 minutes. Seven months later, it would be renamed Headline News. Denise LeClair anchored the first newscast.
- In American college football, with the championship of the top teams determined by rankings a poll of sports writers by the Associated Press (AP), a poll of coaches by United Press International (UPI), and the results of postseason college bowl games, the #1-ranked Clemson University Tigers (11–0–0) defeated the #4-ranked University of Nebraska Cornhuskers (9–2–0), 22 to 15, in the Orange Bowl game in Miami before a crowd of 72,748 fans. The #2-ranked Georgia Bulldogs were upset, 24–20 in the Sugar Bowl game in New Orleans by the #10-ranked Pitt Panthers (who had been ranked No. 1 until the last game of the regular season), and the #3 Alabama Crimson tide lost, 14–12, to the #6 Texas Longhorns at the Cotton Bowl game in Dallas.
- The Provisional Act on Lawyers of the People's Republic of China went into effect, easing the requirements for a Chinese citizen to represent a client in a trial court or an appellate court.
- In the Netherlands, a merger took place between the two largest trade unions for transportation workers, the Nederlandse Bond van Vervoerspersoneel (NBV) of 49,000 members, and the Katholieke Bond van Vervoerspersoneel (KBV) of 20,000. The NBV-KBV combination became the Vervoersbond, or "VB".
- Nippon Kokan (based in the Tokyo suburb of Kawasaki defeated Tokyo's Yomiuri FC soccer football team, 2 to 0, to win the Emperor's Cup
- Malaysia change it's time zone to UTC:8:00 from its former time zone UTC:7:30
- Died: Victor Buono, 43, American character actor on film and television, was found dead in his home.

== January 2, 1982 (Saturday) ==
- The Army of Guatemala, in a campaign by President Fernando Lucas Garcia, killed 35 civilians in the village of Pichec, in the Baja Verapaz Department near Rabinal, for their support of the Guerrilla Army of the Poor (Ejército Guerrillero de los Pobres). The killing was the third of the mostly Maya residents of Pichec, in less than nine weeks, with 32 men killed on November 1 and 30 more on November 22.
- Ahmad Fuad Mohieddin was selected to become the new Prime Minister of Egypt at the request of President Hosni Mubarak, who had held the position of both president and premier since the October 6 assassination of Anwar Sadat.
- In Denmark, the popular television series Matador broadcast its final episode, watched by 3.5 million viewers in a nation of 5.1 million people.
- The Clemson University Tigers football team finished in first place in both polls recognized by the NCAA for determining the U.S. major university football championship. In the AP poll of 49 sportswriters, Clemson received 977 points (based on 20 points for a first place vote, 19 for second place, etc.) and the Texas Longhorns 862 points. In the UPI poll of 37 coaches, Clemson had 547 points and the Pitt Panthers 472.
- In an NFL playoff game nicknamed the "Epic in Miami" as well as "The Game No One Should Have Lost", and ranked in a 2020 survey as the fourth greatest NFL game in the 20th century, the San Diego Chargers defeated the Miami Dolphins, 41 to 38, in overtime, after blowing a 24 to 0 lead in the first quarter. The highest-scoring playoff game in NFL history (79 total points) featured ten touchdowns and extra points, as well two field goals, with Rolf Benirschke making the winning kick after 73 minutes and 52 seconds of play.
- Born:
  - Zhang Juanjuan, Chinese archer Olympic gold medalist and winner of the 2008 women's individual archery competition; in Qingdao, Shandong province.
  - Kim Ji-hyun, South Korean television actress known for Thirty-Nine; in Ulsan
- Died:
  - Fred Harman, 79, American cartoonist known for drawing the Red Ryder comic strip for its entire run from 1938 to 1965
  - Jill McDonald, 54, New Zealand-born English children's book illustrator for Puffin Books
  - Jim Seiler, 65, U.S. market researcher, statistician, and founder in 1949 of Arbitron, the first service for measuring the popularity of radio programs and later of television programs

== January 3, 1982 (Sunday) ==
- In Ghana, where Flight Lieutenant Jerry J. Rawlings had overthrown the government on December 31 and installed himself as the leader of a new executive government, the Provisional National Defense Council, the Council directed that former Vice President William de Graft Johnson and all officials of former President Hilla Limann's government were required to go to police stations and turn themselves in for trial by noon on Monday. By midnight, 27 former officials, "including four former ministers and eight former deputy ministers", surrendered to police.
- South Korea's president, Chun Doo Hwan, fired Prime Minister Nam Duck Woo along with five other cabinet ministers.
- Italia 1, a new television network in Italy, went on the air, broadcasting on 18 stations throughout Italy, competing for viewers against the established RAI (Radiotelevisione italiana) network.

== January 4, 1982 (Monday) ==
- The United States Postal Service inaugurated its new "electronic mail service", "E-COM" (Electronic Computer Originated Service)at 25 specially equipped U.S. post office locations. According to the USPS description, "a company's computer will send a message via a communications common carrier— such as long-distance telephone" to one of the 25 offices and "There, the message will be printed on paper, put in a distinctive blue-and-white E-COM envelope and delivered with regular mail." The service would be discontinued less than four years later, on September 2, 1985.
- U.S. National Security Adviser Richard V. Allen was fired by President Ronald Reagan in the wake of a report by a Japanese newspaper on November 13 that Allen had accepted a $1,000 payment from a Japanese magazine in return for arranging an interview of First Lady Nancy Reagan. Allen was replaced by deputy U.S. secretary of state William P. Clark.
- The nation of Brazil elevated its territory of Rondônia to statehood as its 23rd unidades federativa, with Porto Velho as its capital.
- A mudslide in the U.S. state of California killed at least 31 people, most of whom had been in homes buried in the town of Ben Lomond.
- President Reagan announced in a statement from the White House that the U.S. had submitted a draft of a treaty for the elimination of all medium-range American and Soviet nuclear missiles from Europe. In a statement, Reagan said "Such a treaty would be a major contribution to security, stability and peace. I call on President Brezhnev to join us in this important first step to reduce the nuclear shadow that hangs over the peoples of the world."
- Ghana's former president, Hilla Limann, who had been overthrown on December 31 in a military coup, was arrested at a roadblock near Koforidua after an unsuccessful attempt to flee the African nation, northeast of the capital, Accra.
- President Reagan signed NSDD-17, a top secret directive granting the Central Intelligence Agency (CIA) $19 million to support the Contras, anti-communist right-wing rebels seeking to overthrow the Marxist Sandinistas government of Nicaragua. By 1984, Congress would outlaw the use of any funds to the Contras or to U.S. government agencies for the overthrow of the Nicaraguan government.
- In Sudan, 21 leading members of the parliament, including the Speaker of the Assembly, Samuel Aru Bol, were arrested in Juba by order of President Gaafar Nimeiry for forming an outlawed party, the Council for Unity of Southern Sudan. They would be freed after Nimeiry's overthrow in 1985.
- Òscar Ribas Reig took office as the first Prime Minister of the Principality of Andorra, located in the Pyrennes Mountains on the border between France and Spain, and officially ruled by the Spanish Bishop of Urgel and the President of France as co-Princes, and the 28-members of the General Council of the Valleys.
- Died:
  - Gorilla Jones (William Landon Jones), 75, African-American boxer who held the world middleweight championship from January to June, 1932
  - Margaret Culkin Banning, 90, American novelist and author of 36 novels, four non-fiction books and 90 short stories between 1920 and 1979, including The Vine and the Olive (1964) and Mesabi (1968)

== January 5, 1982 (Tuesday) ==
- The U.N. General Assembly voted, 86 to 21 with 34 abstentions, to approve a non-binding resolution calling all members of the United Nations to end aid, trade, and diplomatic ties with Israel to punish it for annexing the Golan Heights. The U.S. used its power, as a permanent member of the UN Security Council, and vetoed the resolution on January 20.
- South Korea ended a nationwide curfew that had been in place since 1945, and permitted citizens the freedom to be outside from midnight to 4:00 in the morning, a period previously off limits. The curfew remained in effect, however, for areas bordering North Korea. President Chun Doo-hwan said in a statement that South Koreans were "more mature" and that the curfew was no longer necessary.
- The sinking of the Japanese fishing trawler Akebono Maru No.28 killed 32 members of its crew. The ship was at least 130 miles (210 km) away from Adak Island, one the Aleutian Islands off of the coast of the U.S. state of Alaska when it capsized.
- Serial killer Charles Jackson Jr. raped and murdered his final victim, Joan Stewart, a biology professor at San Francisco City College near Montclair, California. Jackson, suspected of murdering seven other people in the Bay Area from 1975 to 1981, would be convicted of the murder of Stewart and sentenced to life imprisonment and would die in 2002, before the extent of his killings would be revealed by DNA profiling not available in 1982.
- Born: Faiza Hasan, Pakistani television actress; in Karachi.
- Died: Hans Conried, 66, American voice actor on television and film, as well as a character actor on stage, died of a heart attack.

== January 6, 1982 (Wednesday) ==
- Speaking at the annual meeting of the American Association for the Advancement of Science at Washington, Dr. James Hansen, a climatologist for NASA's Goddard Institute of Space Studies warned that the increase of carbon dioxide and other chemicals (such as methane and nitrous oxide) in Earth's atmosphere would cause a substantial warming of the Earth's climate during the 1980s, sooner than predictions that global warming would not take place until the 21st century.
- Serial murderer William G. Bonin, a 34-year old truck driver charged with being the "Freeway Killer", was convicted on charges of torturing and murdering 10 young men and boys from May 1979 until his capture on June 12, 1980. He was acquitted of charges of killing two other victims. Initially, he had been linked by investigators to 21 homicides, and indicted for 12.
- Born: Eddie Redmayne, English stage and film actor, winner of the 2014 Academy Award for Best Actor for his portrayal of Stephen Hawking in The Theory of Everything; in Westminster, London
- Died:
  - Shang Yue, 79, Chinese Marxist economic historian and fiction author who was purged in 1958 but rehabilitated in 1976
  - Bill Crawford, 68, American editorial cartoonist

== January 7, 1982 (Thursday) ==
- The American steelmaker U.S. Steel expanded it conglomerate by purchasing the U.S. oil and gasoline company Marathon Oil.
- The Soviet Union halted any further manufacture of the Tupolev Tu-144 supersonic passenger jet.
- The United States Mint began the transition from copper American pennies to a composition of zinc with copper-plating, and minted the first zinc one-cent pieces.
- Born:
  - Yul Edochie, Nigerian film and TV actor; in Lagos
  - Gabrielius Landsbergis, Foreign Minister of Lithuania from 2020 to 2024; in Vilnius, Lithuanian SSR, Soviet Union
- Died:
  - Frank Van der Veer, 60, American special effects producer for multiple films from 1974 until his death, with creations that continued to be used until 1992, and 1976 Academy Award winner
  - Almond E. Fisher, 68, U.S. Army officer and Medal of Honor recipient for heroism in 1944 World War II

== January 8, 1982 (Friday) ==
- To end a federal antitrust suit that had been brought in 1974 by the U.S. Department of Justice, the telephone monopoly American Telephone & Telegraph (AT&T) agreed to sell its 22 individual Bell System companies that had controlled most U.S. telephone lines.
- On the same day, the Department of Justice dropped its 12-year-old antitrust suit against International Business Machines (IBM), ending a trial that had started on May 19, 1975.
- The Umkhonto we Sizwe paramilitary force of South Africa's anti-apartheid African National Congress, carried out an attack on the construction site of the Koeberg Nuclear Power Station, planned to be the white South African government's first nuclear power plant, causing 500 million rands worth of damage and setting back the completion date by 18 months.
- The first White House meeting concerning Project Excalibur, the proposed Strategic Defense Initiative (nicknamed the "Star Wars defense") for the United States against an enemy missile attack, took place as Edward Teller, Karl Bendetsen, William Wilson and Joseph Coors made a one-hour presentation to U.S. President Ronald Reagan for a satellite with lasers that could destroy nuclear missiles after their launch.
- Born:
  - Kim Jong Un, Supreme Leader of North Korea since the 2011 death of his father, Kim Jong Il, and General Secretary of the Workers' Party of Korea since 2012; in Pyongyang
  - Khaled bin Mohamed Al Nahyan, Crown Prince of Abu Dhabi, son of Mohamed bin Zayed Al Nahyan and grandson of Zayed bin Sultan Al Nahyan, President of the United Arab Emirates; in Abu Dhabi
- Died:
  - Reta Shaw, 69, American character actress in film and television, known for Mary Poppins
  - Sidney Robinson Jr., 79, American physiologist and former Olympic athlete known for his research into developing uniforms to minimize thermal stress on the human body
  - Lucille Lee Stewart, 92, American silent film actress

== January 9, 1982 (Saturday) ==
- A frigid blast of Arctic air began in the U.S. Midwest and South, setting records for cold in numerous cities, including a record low in Chicago of 26° below zero F (-32 °C) on the morning of January 10 and a wind chill factor of -100 °F (-73 °C). By January 17, there were 261 deaths attributed to hypothermia form the cold weather.
- The first World Cup series of cross-country skiing was started by the International Ski Federation, beginning with a meet in West Germany at Reit im Winkl for men and Klingenthal for women.
- Born:
  - Catherine, Princess of Wales, wife since 2011 of William, Prince of Wales, heir apparent to the British throne; as Catherine Middleton in Reading, Berkshire
  - Anusha Dandekar, Sudanese-born and Australian-raised Indian supermodel, veejay on MTV India, as well as a film actress, known for Juna Furniture (2024) and Baap Manus (2022); in Khartoum

== January 10, 1982 (Sunday) ==
- In Tehran, assassins opened fire on Mohammad Khamenei, a member of the Majlis parliament, and his bodyguards as he was leaving the Baharestan Palace. Khameini was seriously wounded, and two of his bodyguards were killed.
- The late Liu Shao-chi, referred to since 1979 as Liu Shaoqi, who had the nominal President of the People's Republic of China until being stripped of his functions in 1968 during the Cultural Revolution, was exonerated by the Party of previous charges and posthumously rehabilitated.
- Born: Salina Saibi, Malaysian film and television actress known for the film Jalan Kembali: Bohsia 2; in Kuala Lumpur
- Died:
  - Paul Lynde, 55, American stage and television actor, died of a heart attack.
  - Lazar Weiner, 84, Russian-born American composer
  - Raymond Broshears, 46, American Pentecostal Evangelist preacher and gay rights activst, founder of the Lavender Panthers and co-organizer of the first gay pride march in San Francisco

== January 11, 1982 (Monday) ==
- The lowest temperature ever recorded in England was measured at Newport, Shropshire, where the thermometer reading was −26.1 °C (−15.0 °F).
- Filming began on Return of the Jedi, the third film in the Star Wars franchise, and the conclusion of the original trilogy, with production starting at sound stages the Elstree Studios in England at Borehamwood, Hertfordshire.
- Born:
  - Denis Kolodin, Russian footballer with 23 caps for the Russia national team; in Kamyshin, Russian SFSR, Soviet Union
  - Blake Heron, American actor known for his starring role in the 1996 film Shiloh; in Rockville Centre, New York (d. from a drug overdose, 2017)
- Died:
  - Jiro Horikoshi, Japanese aeronautical engineer who designed the Zero fighter.
  - A. W. Haydon, 75, American inventor wand specialist in miniaturization, known for his invention of 82 devices and innovations, including the microswitch used in computers, as well other devices for use by the general public, by the U.S. military and by NASA
  - Sir Kenneth Strong, 81, British Army Major General and advisor of the Normandy Landings on D-Day in 1944, as well as negotiating the surrender of both Italy and Japan
  - Carl M. Voyles, 83, American Canadian football head coach for the Hamilton Tiger-Cats, known for guiding the team to winning the 1953 Grey Cup
  - Manya Surve, 37, Indian gangster, suspected in multiple murders and robberies, became the first of 622 criminals in Bombay to die in an "encounter killing" by police in the Maharashtra state.
  - Madeline Montalban, 72, English astrologer and ceremonial magician, died from lung cancer
  - Matsumoto Hakuō I (stage name for Junjirō Fujima), 71, Japanese kabuki theater actor and dancer

== January 12, 1982 (Tuesday) ==
- Canada's Prime Minister Pierre Trudeau announced that he was reorganizing several Canadian federal ministries, and that the existing Ministry of Industry, Trade and Commerce would be broken up into a Ministry for Economic and Regional Development.
- Kevin McGrady, a terrorist of the Provisional IRA who had become a born-again Christian, walked into the Musgrave Street police station in Belfast and confessed to 27 crimes committed in 1975, including three murders. After being sentenced to life imprisonment in June, McGrady agreed to become a "supergrass" and his testimony led to the conviction of seven IRA members in 1983.
- The PBS television series American Playhouse telecast its first play, The Shady Hill Kidnapping, written and narrated by John Cheever. The series would run for 13 seasons, ending on September 29, 1996.
- Born:
  - Tony Lochhead, New Zealand footballer with 47 caps for the New Zealand national team from 2003 to 2013; in Tauranga
  - Da Peng (stage name for Dong Chengpeng), Chinese comedian, filmmaker and TV show host; in Ji'an City, Jilin province
- Died:
  - Dorothy Howel, 83, Brisith pianist and concerto composer.
  - Major General Frank Crowther Roberts, 90, British Army officer and recipient of the Victoria Cross for heroism during World War One
  - Major General Harold William Chase, 59, U.S. Marine Corps officer and Deputy Assistant Secretary of Defense from 1977 to 1980, died following a heart attack.

== January 13, 1982 (Wednesday) ==
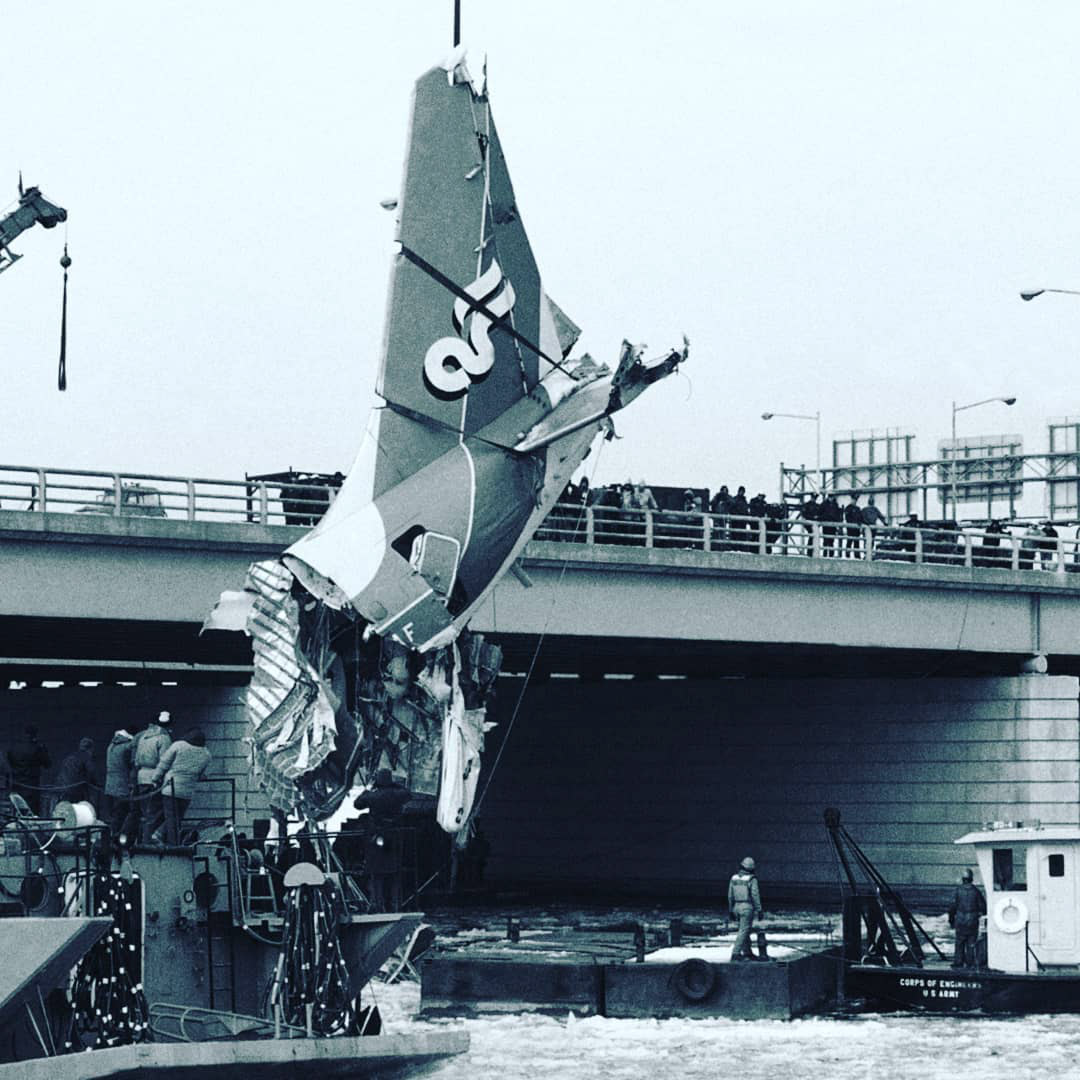
January 13, 1982: Air Florida 90 crashes into Washington DC's 14th Street Bridge, killing 74 on the plane and four on the bridge

- Air Florida Flight 90 crashed shortly after takeoff into the 14th Street Bridge in Washington, D.C., then fell into the Potomac River, killing 74 of the 79 people on board, and four people on the bridge. The Boeing 737 jet departed during a snowstorm from Washington National Airport with a scheduled destination of Tampa, Florida, but the pilots had failed to switch on the ice protection system on the four engines, and then chose not to abort the takeoff after detecting a power problem from ice and snow building on the wings. Flight 90 became airborne at 4:00 in the afternoon, reached an altitude of 352 feet (107 m) before stalling and came down at the bridge 30 seconds after takeoff. Before impact, pilot Larry M. Weaton shouted "Stalling, we're falling!" The last words of First Officer Roger A. Pettit were, "Larry, we're going down, Larry...." and Weaton responded "I know!".
- Half an hour after the Air Florida crash, the Washington Metro subway system sustained its first fatal accident when a train that had departed from the station at Washington National Airport toward New Carrolton, Maryland, derailed near the Smithsonian station, killing three passengers and injuring 15 others.
- President's rule in India's state of Assam was ended by President N. Sanjiva Reddy after seven months when Keshab Chandra Gogoi formed a new government as Chief Minister of Assam.
- A jury in Los Angeles convicted former boxing promoter Harold Rossfields Smith, aka Ross Eugene Fields, of embezzlement of $21.3 million from the Wells Fargo banking company in 1981.
- Sir Ninian Martin Stephen was selected by Queen Elizabeth II to become the next Governor-General of Australia, to take the place of Sir Zelman Cowen at the latter's retirement in July.
- Died: Marcel Camus, 69, French film director known for Black Orpheus (Orfeu Negro), winner of the 1959 Palme d'Or and the 1960 Academy Award for Best Foreign Language Film, died following open heart surgery.

== January 14, 1982 (Thursday) ==
- An Ethiopian Air Force Antonov An-26 crashed near Addis Ababa, Ethiopia while transporting a group of Ethiopian, Libyan and Cuban soldiers to a fight in Eritrea. All 73 occupants on board were killed.
- It the state of Hidalgo in Mexico, near the town of Atotonilco de Tula, the bodies of 13 men were found by a drainage canal. The dead men would be found to have been from Colombia, who had been arrested, as well as a Mexican taxicab driver who had helped transport them to the scene of the deaths. Mexico City Police Chief Arturo Durazo Moreno, accused by a subordinate of having planned the killings, would end up fleeing Mexico after the inauguration of a new president.
- Robert Dale Henderson began a spree of mostly random murders that would kill 12 people across five U.S. states, in a little more than three weeks until his arrest on February 6, starting with a beautician in Cincinnati. One week later, on January 21, he murdered a family of three in Cherry Fork, Ohio, followed by the January 24 killing of a receptionist in Charleston, South Carolina, the January 25 homicides of a doctor and a clerk in Palatka, Florida and a mother and daughter later in the day in Valdosta, Georgia. He killed a nightclub owner in Port Allen, Louisiana on January 29, and three hitchhikers in Hernando County, Florida on February 4, before approaching a deputy sheriff at a shopping center in Punta Gorda, Florida, making a confession, and surrendering. Henderson would be executed in the electric chair in the Florida State Prison on April 21, 1993, fourteen months after his arrest.
- Serial killer David Bullock, suspected in having killed six people with a .38 caliber revolver in one month, from December 5 to January 4, was arrested by the New York Police Department. He would plead guilty to all charges on October 26, commenting "I was in the Christmas spirit. It made me happy." Bullock would be sentenced to 150 years imprisonment.
- The popular Tamil language film Pokkiri Raja (King of Rogues), an action comedy produced by AVM Saravanan, directed by S. P. Muthuraman and starring Rajinikanth (Shivaji Rao Gaikwad) in two roles, was released in India by Ananda Films.
- Born:
  - Ireti Osayemi, Nigerian film actress and 2017 Best of Nollywood Award winner for best supporting actress in Ojo Meta (Three Days); in Lagos State
  - Joe Dunthorne, Welsh novelist known for Submarine; in Swansea

== January 15, 1982 (Friday) ==
- The U.S. Federal Trade Commission dropped its 10-year-old antitrust lawsuit against the three largest makers of cereal in the nation— Kellogg, General Mills and General Foods.
- Hekuran Isai became the Minister of Internal Affairs for the People's Republic of Albania, as well as the director of the Communist nation's secret police, the Sigurimi, after the previous Internal Affairs Minister, Feçor Shehu, was arrested as part of a purge of government officials. The appointment came as the Albanian People's Assembly unanimously approved the appointment of Adil Çarçani as the new Prime Minister of Albania following the December 17 death by gunshot wound of Premier Mehmet Shehu.
- The Guatemalan Army invaded the village of Ilom (village) near Chajul and killed 28 men from the Mayan minority. A deadlier mass execution of 96 Mayan peasants would take place on March 23, 1982.
- The Lima Liturgy, drafted by Max Thurian, was celebrated in a multidenominational Christian gathering by the World Council of Churches
- Forbidden Broadway, an off-Broadway musical revue, written by Gerard Alessandrini and featuring parodies of current Broadway musicals, was given its first of 2,332 performances, opening at Palsson's Supper Club (now the Triad Theatre) in New York City.
- David Gibbons resigned as Premier of Bermuda and was succeeded by John Swan.
- Born:
  - Vyacheslav Gryaznov, Russian classical pianist; in Yuzhno-Sakhalinsk, Sakhalin, Russian SFSR, Soviet Union
  - Filip Karadordević, U.S.-born Serbian businessman and heir to the throne of the abolished monarchy of Serbia and Yugoslavia as the eldest son of the former Crown Prince Alexander Karadordević, who was the only child of King Peter II of Yugoslavia; in Vienna, Virginia
- Died: Red Smith, 76, American sportswriter and columnist, died four days after he had published a column, which he headlined "Writing Less— and Better?" where he announced that he would be writing only three columns per week rather than four.

== January 16, 1982 (Saturday) ==
- The United Kingdom and Vatican City established diplomatic relations at the ambassadorial level for the first time.
- In the state of Kerala in India, 24 people were killed in the sinking of an overcrowded boat as it was crossing Sasthamcotta Lake in poor weather, followed by a sinking of a boat that had come to the survivors' rescue."41 years since the Sasthamkotta Lake disaster", www.madhyamam.com (in Malayalam)
- Random drawings were held by FIFA at the Palacio de Congresos (Madrid) in Madrid for the grouping of the 24 teams that had qualified for the 1982 FIFA World Cup to be held in Spain starting on June 13. Of the 24 teams, divided by lot into six 4-team groups, 14 were UEFA members from Europe, 4 were CONMEBOL members from South America, 2 were CONCACAF teams from Central America, two from Africa, one (New Zealand) from Oceania and one (Kuwait) from the Middle East. National teams appearing for the first time in the World Cup were Honduras, New Zealand, Algeria, Cameroon and Kuwait.
- Born: Birgitte Hjort Sørensen, Danish stage, film and television actress known as co-star of the political drama series Borgen; in Hillerød
- Died:
  - Marcel Francisci, 62, French businessman and smuggler accused of being the mastermind of the French Connection narcotics trafficking network, was shot to death in Paris as he was preparing to get into his car.
  - Mahmud Yunus, 82, Indonesian Muslim preacher and author of 75 theological books

== January 17, 1982 (Sunday) ==
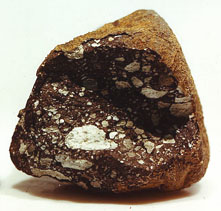
Found on Earth after falling from the Moon

- The Allan Hills meteorite, the first to be identified on Earth as having come from the Moon, was discovered in the Transantarctic Mountains in Antarctica by John Schutt and Ian Whillans during the international ANSMET (Antarctic Search for Meteorites) expedition. The meteorite's mass was 31.4 grams (1.11 oz), slightly more than one ounce. Although the lunar meteorite Yamato 791197 had been found on November 20, 1979, it would not be identified as such until 1984. In 1996, examination of the
- The collapse of a swinging bridge over the Guaíra Falls waterfall killed 32 tourists in Brazil, on the border of Brazil and Paraguay near Guaira, while they were seeking a close view of the waterfall. Those killed fell from a height of 120 feet (37 m) and drowned in the Paraná River. Survivors said that some people on the bridge had been swinging it when the supportive cables snapped.

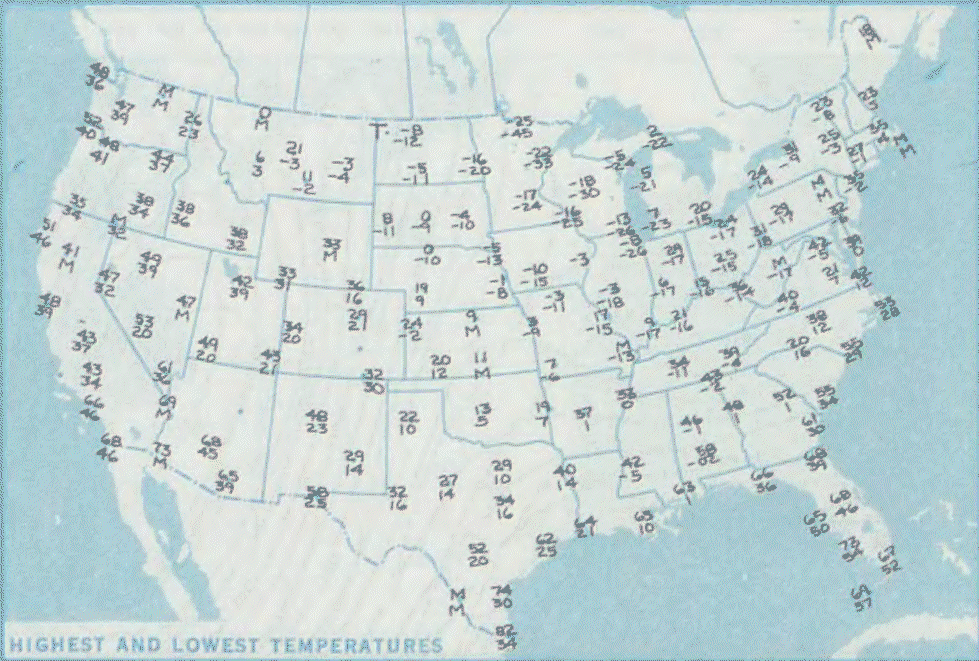
High and low temperatures on January 17, 1982

- The lowest temperatures on record in most cities in the eastern United States were set after a mass of cold air came south from Canada. Record lows ranged from International Falls, Minnesota −45 °F (−43 °C) to Washington, D.C. and Jackson, Mississippi−5 °F (−21 °C), and were set in Milwaukee −26 °F (−32 °C), Pittsburgh −18 °F (−28 °C) and Cleveland −17 °F (−27 °C)
- Winston Cenac resigned as Prime Minister of Saint Lucia after 8 months in office, and was succeeded temporarily by Finance Minister Michael Pilgrim.
- Born: Dwyane Wade, American NBA player and team owner, 2006 MVP of the NBA Finals for the Miami Heat, inductee to the Basketball Hall of Fame, and later a minority owner of the Utah Jazz and the WNBA Chicago Sky; in Chicago
- Died:
  - Varlam Shalamov, Russian writer known for Kalyma's Notes, an exposure of the horrors of Soviet labor camps, where he had been incarcerated from 1937 to 1954
  - Jusuf Gërvalla, 38, Albanian-born Yugoslavian Kosovo independence activist and founder of a Yugoslavian separatist group, the National Movement for the Liberation of Kosovo, was shot to death in West Germany by Yugoslavia's State Security Service. He, his brother Bardhosh Gërvalla, and another activist, Kadri Zeka, were sitting in a car in the town of Untergruppenbach when all three were killed.
  - William Price, 86, British World War One flying ace with seven shootdowns
  - Pierre De Cazenove De Pradines, 87, French flying ace in World War One with seven aerial victories.

== January 18, 1982 (Monday) ==
- A simultaneous crash of four T-38 jets killed the four pilots for the Thunderbirds stunt flying team of the U.S. Air Force, as they were flying in formation at Indian Springs Air Force Auxiliary Field in Nevada in preparation of a flying show set for March.
- U.S. Army Lieutenant Colonel Charles R. Ray, an assistant military attache in France, was shot and killed, in front of his home in Paris as he was leaving his apartment to drive to his job at the U.S. Embassy. Georges Ibrahim Abdallah, a terrorist from Lebanon who had founded the Lebanese Armed Revolutionary Factions, would be arrested almost three years later in Lyon, convicted of complicity in the murder of Lt. Col. Ray and of the March 31 killing of Israeli diplomat Yacov Barsimantov, and would serve 41 years of a life sentence before being released in 2025.
- Born:
  - Joanna Newsom, American folk singer; in Grass Valley, California
  - Phạm Phương Thảo, Vietnamese folk singer; in Nghi Lộc district, Nghệ An province
- Died:
  - Juan O'Gorman, 76, Mexican artist and architect, was found dead from an apparent suicide.
  - Frank C. Baxter, 85, American literature professor and television host of the CBS series Shakespeare on TV and the ABC series Telephone Time, winner of seven Emmy Awards, including Outstanding Male Performer (1954), and 1960 for Outstanding Male Personality (1960).
  - Josef Mai, 94, German fighter ace with 30 victories in World War One;
  - Trent Lehman, 20, former American child actor known for Nanny and the Professor, hanged himself. His suicide and the deaths of two other former child actors would inspire the founding by former child actor Paul Petersen of the advocacy and support group A Minor Consideration in 1990.
  - Jenő Ghyczy, 88, Hungarian Foreign Minister from 1943 to 1944

== January 19, 1982 (Tuesday) ==
- The explosion of a boiler at the Star Elementary School in Spencer, Oklahoma, killed five children and a schoolteacher while they were at lunch in the school cafeteria, and injured 35 others.
- The Iran Liberation Front was founded by former Prime Minister Ali Amini and other Iranians in exile in Paris with the goal of restoring the Iranian monarchy (abolished in 1979) and placing former Crown Prince Reza Pahlavi, son of Mohammad Reza Pahlavi, last Shah of Iran, as head of state. Funded by the American CIA, the Front would achieve its greatest success on September 5, 1986, by overriding all Iranian television channels to deliver an 11-minute speech from Reza Pahlavi.
- The Coca-Cola Company announced its plans to purchase ownership of the filmmaker Columbia Pictures.
- Born: Juan García Postigo, Spanish actor and model known for winning the 2007 Mister World male beauty competition; in Málaga
- Died:
  - Semyon Tsvigun, 64, Soviet Ukrainian intelligence agent, deputy to Soviet KGB Director (and future Soviet Communist Party leader Yuri Andropov), died from an apparent suicide.
  - Leopold Trepper, 77, Polish-born Soviet anti-Fascist espionage leader of the Red Orchestra spy network, later imprisoned in the Soviet Union after being accused of cooperation with Germany as a prisoner of war, died in Israel, where he had been allowed to emigrate in 1973.
  - Marya Zaturenska, 80, Russian-born American lyric poet and 1938 Pulitzer Prize winner.

== January 20, 1982 (Wednesday) ==
- Musician Ozzy Osbourne was treated for rabies after allegedly biting the head off a live bat during a concert at Veterans Auditorium in Des Moines, Iowa. A spokesman for Broadlawn Medical Center reported that the patient registered as John M. Osbourne "was given a rabies shot and rabies vaccine and a tetanus shot as well," and that the medical report gave the history "Patient bit head off bat." Des Moines police lieutenant Derald Leaming said "I told his manager if he bit the head off any animals while he was here, he'd be arrested. We would have arrested him on the spot if we'd seen anything like that," while two other officers said that he had seen Osbourne "put a couple of birds in his mouth but he let them loose", and that although the police didn't see a bat, that they "did see raw liver on the floor."
- Born: Pete Buttigieg, American politician, U.S. Secretary of Transportation from 2021 to 2025, 2020 candidate for the Democratic Party nomination for U.S. president; in South Bend, Indiana
- Died: Marc Demeyer, 31, Belgian professional bicyclist known for winning individual stages twice in the Tour de France (1978 and 1979) and twice in the 1977 Giro d'Italia, died of a heart attack.

== January 21, 1982 (Thursday) ==
- By a margin of 55% to 45%, the 498,000 members of the Britain's national coal workers union voted to accept a 9.3% pay offer, despite the recommendation of union president-elect Arthur Scargill to reject the proposal.
- Died:
  - Ned Irish, 76, American NBA team owner and founder of the New York Knicks, and enshrinee in the Basketball Hall of Fame.
  - William Luneberg, 69, president of the American Motors Corporation (AMC) who developed the company as the fourth largest automaker in the U.S. (after General Motors, Ford Motor Company, and Chrysler Corporation)

== January 22, 1982 (Friday) ==
- In the U.S. state of Washington, the board of directors of the state's Public Power Supply System voted to halt further construction of two nuclear power plants, bringing the number of construction permit revocations to 30 in the U.S. since the beginning of 1979.
- The first convictions in the U.S., on criminal charges of slavery resulting in death, were issued by a federal jury in North Carolina for Dennis Warren, a migrant labor crew leader, and along with his brother Richard Warren, and his assistant John Lester Harris.
- Died:
  - Eduardo Frei, 71, President of Chile from 1964 to 1970 and a critic of the regime of President Augusto Pinochet, died after having surgery at a hospital in Santiago for a hiatal hernia, reported initially as death from sepsis. More than 35 years later, allegations would be made that Frei had been poisoned by members of Pinochet's secret police organization, the CNI and although six defendants would be found guilty of homicide in 2019, the convictions would be overturned on appeal and a Chilean court would conclude that Frei was not a victim of homicide.
  - Hans Fidesser, 90, Austrian opera tenor
  - Ragini Devi (stage name for Esther Sherman), 88, American performer of Indian classical dance
  - Edward Farber, 67, American photographer and inventor of the portable strobe light.

== January 23, 1982 (Saturday) ==
- In the U.S., the CBS television network broadcast The Uncounted Enemy: A Vietnam Deception, a 90-minute investigative documentary alleging that General William Westmoreland and other officials had suppressed and altered estimates of the actual troop strength of the Viet Cong within South Vietnam during the Vietnam War. U.S. Army Chief of Staff, General William Westmoreland during the war, and commander of U.S. troops in South Vietnam, was accused of manipulating the estimates of the number of communist infiltrators, and would file a $20 million lawsuit for libel on September 13, 1982, against the CBS network, as well as producer George Crile II, narrator Mike Wallace and former CIA analyst Samuel A. Adams.
- Australian thoroughbred horse trainer Colin Hayes, set a world record as horses he had trained finished in first place in 10 races, seven at Victoria Park in Adelaide and three others at Caulfield race track, on the same day."Big stable in a haze over all that success", by Glenn Lester, The Age (Sydney), January 25, 1982, p. 27
- Died:
  - Leonard Sillman, 72, U.S. Broadway theatre producer known for his discovery and introduction of new acting stars, including Henry Fonda, Imogene Coca, and Paul Lynde.
  - Hope Hampton, 84, American opera soprano, silent film actress, and socialite "Hope Hampton, Opera Singer and First-Nighter, Dies at 84", by Joyce Purnick, The New York Times January 24, 1982, p. I-28

== January 24, 1982 (Sunday) ==
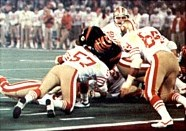
A scene from the game, with the 49ers in white jerseys

- The San Francisco 49ers defeated the Cincinnati Bengals 26 to 21, to win Super Bowl XVI at the Pontiac Silverdome in Pontiac, Michigan. The telecast of the game continues to hold the record for highest television ratings for a Super Bowl broadcast, with a 49.1 rating and a 73 share of the audience, with almost three out of four households with television watching the game.
- U.S. astronomer Edward L. G. Bowell discovered three asteroids in the same day, designating the 9 miles (14 km) minor planet as 3131 Mason-Dixon. The name honored English astronomers and surveyors Charles Mason and Jeremiah Dixon for whom the "Mason–Dixon line" boundary between U.S. states was named. On the same day, Bowell discovered 3749 Balam, which has two minor-planet moons revolving around it, and 2905 Plaskett.
- Born: Jamie "Killer" Lyon, Australian professional rugby league centre, selected as the National Rugby League's Dally M Medal winner for centre of the year in 2010, 2011, 2013 and 2014, and Centre of the Year by the Rugby League International Federation in 2011 and 2013; in Narrabri, New South Wales
- Died:
  - Alfredo Ovando Candia, 65, President of Bolivia from 1969 to 1970
  - Karol Borsuk, 76, Polish mathematician and topologist known for the theories of absolute retracts (ARs) and absolute neighborhood retracts (ANRs), as well as the Borsuk-Spanier cohomotopy groups, Borsuk's conjecture, the Borsuk–Ulam theorem and the Bing–Borsuk conjecture.
  - Fernando Sánchez Polack, 61, Spanish film actor with appearances in 110 films, primarily Westerns, from 1959 to 1992, died from a cardiac arrest.

== January 25, 1982 (Monday) ==
- In a speech in Asmara, Ethiopia's President Mengistu Haile Mariam announced his "Red Star Campaign", a military operation to destroy the Eritrean People's Liberation Front and the Tigray People's Liberation Front secessionist groups in Eritrea Province. The campaign would begin on February 15, 1982, and last for almost five months, until July 5, with at least 10,000 Ethiopian and 4,000 Eritrean soldiers killed.
- Propaganda Due (P2), the controversial Italian Masonic lodge, was formally dissolved after 105 years of operation.
- The Amol uprising, an unsuccessful rebellion by Siamak Zaim of the League of Iranian Communists, was launched against the Islamic Republic government in Iran's Mazandaran province.
- The R. E. Ginna Nuclear Power Plant near Ontario, New York in the U.S. sustained a nuclear accident when a tube on a steam generator ruptured and radioactive steam was released for 93 minutes before the problem was fixed.
- Born: Heather Hardy, enshrinee in the International Women's Boxing Hall of Fame as world female featherweight champion of the World Boxing Organization from 2018 to 2019; in Brooklyn, New York City
- Died:
  - Mikhail Suslov, 79, Deputy General Secretary of the Soviet Communist Party and the Party's second only to General Secretary and President Leonid Brezhnev.
  - William Russel Huber, 79, U.S. Navy sailor and recipient of the Medal of Honor
  - Mildred Christman, 86, American rodeo bronco riding champion, trick rider, and actress

== January 26, 1982 (Tuesday) ==
- Prime Minister Mauno Koivisto was elected President of Finland by the 301-member Electoral College, receiving 167 votes. He was sworn in the next day to succeed longtime president Urho Kekkonen. Koivistor had obtained 43% of the popular vote in voting on January 17 and January 18
- The government of Israel's Prime Minister Menachem Begin survived a vote of no confidecnce by a margin of 55 to 52 regarding compensation to be paid to Israeli citizens who had settled in the Sinai Peninsula, scheduled to be returned to Egypt after 15 years.
- U.S. President Ronald Reagan delivered his first State of the Union speech since taking office and proposed "New Federalism", the transfer of administration and control of funding for social programs from the U.S. Department of Health and Human Services to the individual state governments.
- In India, the popular Tamil language film Vaazhvey Maayam (Life is an Illusion), directed by R. Krishnamoorthy, opened at theaters and would run for almost seven months. The romantic drama starred Kamal Haasan, Sridevi and Sripriya.
- The "Palace on Wheels", a luxury tourist train operated by Indian Railways and the Rajasthan Tourism Development Corporation, began operations.
- Born: Mamta Kharab, Indian field hockey player and captain of the women's national team; in Givana, Sonipat district, Haryana state
- Died: Jean Outland Chrysler, 60, American philanthropist and art collector whose donation of works formed the Chrysler Museum of Art; in Norfolk, Virginia

== January 27, 1982 (Wednesday) ==
- A train crash killed 131 people in Algeria at the town of Bouhalouane in Chlef Province. After the locomotive and eight passenger cars stalled while climbing a steep grade in the Atlas Mountains. The locomotive was uncoupled from the rest of the train, and the unsecured train cars rolled back down the slope and collided with a freight train at the station.
- On the same day in India, a train crash killed at least 63 people at Agra in Uttar Pradesh when a passenger express train was struck by a freight train that had pulled into its path.
- The government of Garret FitzGerald in Ireland was defeated, 82 to 81, on its budget and the 22nd Dáil was dissolved, with new elections for the 166 seats of the Dáil Éireann to take place on February 18.
- Seven members of the Colombian terrorist group M-19 hijacked an Aerotal Airways Boeing 727 flight with 121 other people aboard, shortly after it took off from Bogotá on a flight toward Pereira, Colombia. The M-19 group diverted the plane to Cali, where 47 women, children and elderly passengers were released, and threatened to blow the plane up if their demands were not met. The next day, a private jet was provided to the hijackers in return for the release of the remaining hostages and allowed to fly to Havana in Cuba, following a mediation by the Catholic Church. After landing Havana, the hijackers surrendered to police.
- In a simultaneous publication, The New York Times and the Washington Post broke the story by Post reporter Alma Guillermoprieto and Times reporter Raymond Bonner about the El Mozote massacre where the army of El Salvador had carried out the mass execution of at least 811 civilians.
- Dr. Roberto Suazo Cordova was installed as President of Honduras, becoming the first civilian president of the Central American nation since the 1979 military coup that had brought down the previous civilian government.
- Died: Tran Van Huong, 79, the last President of South Vietnam for seven days (April 21–28, 1975) before the fall of Saigon, and Prime Minister 1964-1965 and 1968–1969, died at his home in Ho Chi Minh City

== January 28, 1982 (Thursday) ==
- In Padua, 10 agents of Italy's NOCS anti-terrorism force rescued U.S. Army Brigadier General James L. Dozier, who had been kidnapped by the Red Brigades terrorist group on December 17.
- Kemal Arikan, the consul general of the Turkey's consulate in the U.S. city of Los Angeles, was shot to death while stopped at a traffic light while driving home. Two Americans of Armenian descent, Harry Sassounian and Krikor Saliba, approached his car at the intersection of Comstock Avenue and Wilshire Boulevard and began firing. A group calling itself the Justice Commandos of the Armenian Genocide took responsibility for the shooting and gave as its motive the 1915 genocide of more than one million Armenians by the government of Turkey, 12 years before Arikan had been born, but had allegedly made a speech condemning Armenians. Arikan, struck 14 times by bullets, died at the scene. Sassounian would be found guilty of murder in 1984, and initially sentenced to life imprisonment without possibility of parole, but would be freed in 2021 after more than 38 years incarceration. Saliba was never found.
- At 5:30 in the morning local time (20:30 UTC on 27 January) at Kurashiki in Japan's Okayama Prefecture, Japanese astronomer Minoru Honda discovered the nova V1370 Aquilae more than 9,000 years after it had happened.
- Died: Andrea Buchanan, 26, American professional tennis player was shot to death along with her supervisor, Nathanial Brown, at Brown's Fish Market in Los Angeles, where she had been working as a cashier to supplement her tennis income. Buchanan had last appeared at the U.S. Open, where she had lost in the second round in the women's singles tournament in September, and was ranked at 105th in the world by the Women's Tennis Association.

== January 29, 1982 (Friday) ==
- The Philadelphia Bulletin published its final issue, after having been printed every day for 134 years. The farewell issue bore the headline "Goodbye: After 134 years, a Philadelphia voice is silent"
- Boater Steven Callahan departed from El Hierro, one of the Canary Islands, with a goal of crossing the Atlantic Oean toward Antigua, the larger island of the Caribbean nation of Antigua and Barbuda. He disappeared on February 5, 1982 and his fate was uncertain for 76 days as he survived alone in a life raft when his boat sank, before being rescued on April 20.
- Born:
  - Riff Raff (stage name for Horst Simco), American rap artist; in Houston
  - Adam Lambert, American singer and TV actor; in Indianapolis
  - Panu Aaltio, Finnish film composer; in Nurmijärvi
- Died:
  - Hironori Ōtsuka, 89, Japanese martial artist who created Wadō-ryū, one of the four major karate styles
  - Sir Rudolph Peters, 92, British biochemist whose research team created the antidote for the chemical warfare poison lewisite
  - Gabriel Fabella, 83, Philippine historian who successfully lobbied in 1962 for changing Philippine independence day from July 4 to June 12, based on the 1898 declaration of independence
  - Palden Thondup Namgyal, 58, the last King of Sikkim prior to its 1973 annexation to India, died in New York City from complications of cancer surgery.
  - Murtaza Ali Khan, 55, former heir apparent to the throne of the Nawab of the Indian princely state of Rampur prior to its annexation into the state of Uttar Pradesh

== January 30, 1982 (Saturday) ==
- In a referendum in the U.S. territory of Guam, voters decided on which of seven options they supported for the territory's future status, with 9,929 valid votes cast. Almost half of the voters— 4,914 — 51 short of a majority, supported becoming a U.S. Commonwealth while 2,547 (slightly more than one-fourth) supported seeking statehood within the United States. A little more than 10 percent preferred to keep Guam's status the way that it was, and 379 opted for becoming an independent nation. Because no choice attained a majority, a second referendum was held on September 4 between the top two choices, commonwealth status or statehood.
- The highest temperature ever measured in Antarctica was recorded on Signy Island at the British operated Signy Research Station, as the thermometer reached 19.8 degrees Celsius (67.6° Fahrenheit)
- China National Offshore Oil Corporation (CNOOC), the first national oil company for the People's Republic of China, was incorporated by the Chinese government for exploration of offshore oil and natural gas. Its monopoly and its status as the largest Chinese energy company would be superseded by PetroChina in 1999 and by Sinopec in 2000.
- The first computer virus, the Elk Cloner, written by 15-year old Rich Skrenta, was found in Apple II that had been infected from a floppy disk. Every 50th time the Apple II program was run, it would display a poem titled "Elk Cloner: The Program with a Personality", with the verse, "It will get on all your disks/ It will infiltrate your chips/ Yes it's Cloner/ It will stick to you like glue /It will modify RAM too/ Send in the Cloner!"
- Born: Lee Seung-gun, South Korean dentist and businessman who became a billionaire after his founding of the financial services company Viva Republica in 2014; in Seoul
- Died:
  - Stanley Holloway, 91, English stage and film actor known for portraying Eliza Doolittle's father in My Fair Lady onf film and stage
  - Lluís Nonell, 55, Spanish stage, film and TV actor, died on stage at the Teatro Princesa in Valencia while performing in the play El diluvio que viene, during "a scene in which he addressed the audience, prentending to throw them coins."
  - Helen Merrell Lynd, 85, American sociologist and co-author, with her husband Robert S. Lynd, of Middletown: A Study in Modern American Culture, the detailed 1929 study of a small American municipality, later revealed to have been Muncie, Indiana
  - Refaat Al-Gammal, 54, Egyptian spy and agent for the Mukhabarat, Egypt's intelligence agent and secret police, died of lung cancer in Götzenhain in West Germany, where he had lived under the alias "Jacques Bitton".
  - Samuel "Lightnin'" Hopkins, 69, African-American country blues singer and guitarist
  - Virginia Marshall, 63, American child actress in silent film, including the Tom Mix western My Own Pal (1926)

== January 31, 1982 (Sunday) ==
- The documentary Let Poland be Poland was televised around the world and reportedly watched by 185,000,000 in 50 nations. Hosted by Charlton Heston in the U.S., the show included appearances by Paul McCartney, Orson Welles, Henry Fonda, Kirk Douglas, Max von Sydow, James A. Michener, Glenda Jackson, Madeleine Albright and the song "Ever Homeward", sung by Frank Sinatra. The show also featured recorded segments from world leaders, including U.S. President Ronald Reagan, UK Prime Minister Margaret Thatcher, German Chancellor Helmut Schmidt, Japanese premier Zenkō Suzuki, French President François Mitterrand, and prime ministers Pierre Trudeau (Canada), Arnaldo Forlani (Italy), Adolfo Suárez (Spain), Kåre Willoch (Norway), Bülend Ulusu (Turkey), Francisco Pinto Balsemão (Portugal), Wilfried Martens (Belgium), Pierre Werner (Luxembourg) and Gunnar Thoroddsen (Iceland).
- The Statute of Autonomy of the Principality of Asturias went into effect, recognizing the right of self-government of the Spanish region of 78 municipalities in areas formerly occupied by the medieval Kingdom of Asturias, including the capital, Oviedo.
- Spain's province of Santander was renamed Cantabria

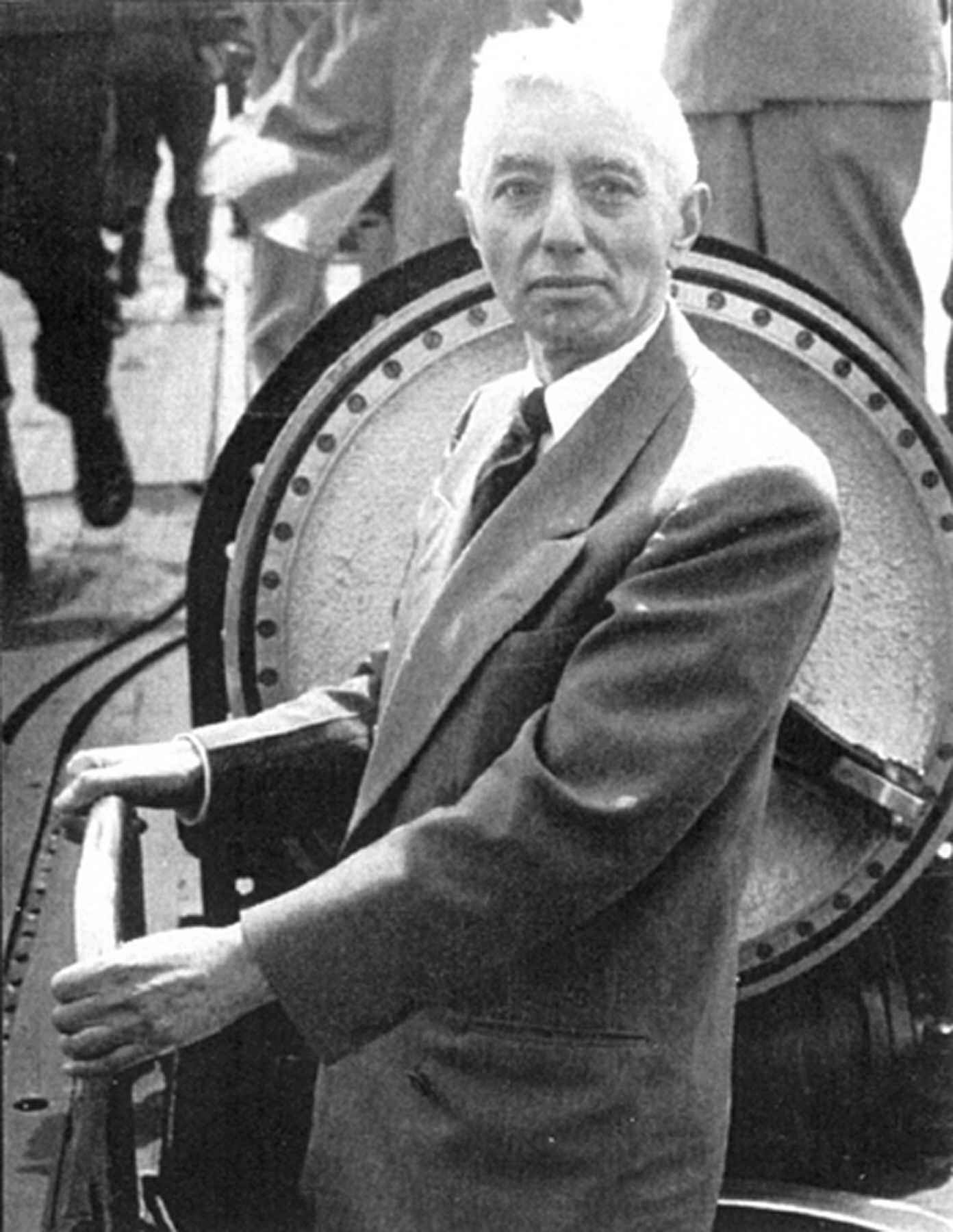
Rickover inspecting the nuclear submarine USS Nautilus in 1955

- U.S. Navy Fleet Admiral Hyman G. Rickover, nicknamed "Father of the Nuclear Navy", was forcibly retired four days after his 82nd birthday. Admiral Rickover's 63 years of active service in the U.S. Navy made him the longest-serving member of the U.S. armed forces.
- The fifth annual Charity Shield game of Australia's National Soccer League was played, matching the 1981 first-place finisher (Sydney City and the NSL Cup winner, the Brisbane Lions. Sydney City won, 3 to 1.
- Born:
  - Marta Nieto, Spanish film and television actress known for the 2019 film Madre; in Murcia
  - Jena Lee Nardella, American activist for clean water and ending AIDS in Africa; in Woodland, California
  - Helena Paparizou, Swedish-born Greek singer; in Borås, Västergötland
- Died:
  - Agnes Sligh Turnbull, 93, American novelist
  - Kuljeet Singh and Jasbir Singha, convicted kidnappers and murderers who had killed two teenagers in India in 1978, were hanged at the Tihar Jail in New Delhi.
  - Captain Cyril Gourley, 89, British Army officer and recipient of the Victoria Cross.

== See also ==
- Deaths in January 1982
