= Robert Lowry, Baron Lowry =

Northern Irish judge (1919–1999)

The Right Honourable The Lord Lowry PC, PC (NI)

Lord Chief Justice of Northern Ireland
- In office 1971–1989
- Preceded by: The Lord MacDermott
- Succeeded by: Sir Brian Hutton

Personal details
- Born: 30 January 1919
- Died: 15 January 1999 (aged 79)

Robert Lynd Erskine Lowry, Baron Lowry (30 January 1919 – 15 January 1999), was a Lord Chief Justice of Northern Ireland and a Lord of Appeal in Ordinary. He was knighted in 1971 and created a life peer in 1979.

The son of a former Attorney General for Northern Ireland, Lowry was educated in Belfast and at Cambridge. After serving in the British Army during the Second World War, he was called to the Bar of Northern Ireland in 1947 and appointed to the High Court of Northern Ireland in 1964.

== Early life ==
His father was former Ulster Unionist member of parliament and Attorney-General for Northern Ireland William Lowry. His mother was a niece of Sinn Féin activist, Robert Wilson Lynd. He attended the Royal Belfast Academical Institution and Jesus College, Cambridge, where he read Classics.

== Military ==
During the Second World War, Lowry fought with the Royal Inniskilling Fusiliers in Tunisia, followed by the Royal Irish Fusiliers before becoming a Major in 1945.

He held the title of honorary colonel for:

- 38th Irish Infantry Brigade – 5th Battalion and 7th Battalion
- Royal Irish Rangers- 5th (Volunteer) Battalion

== Law ==
Lowry was admitted to the Bar of Northern Ireland in 1947. He was a High Court judge in Northern Ireland from 1964 until he became Lord Chief Justice of Northern Ireland in 1971, when he was also made a Northern Ireland Privy Counsellor.

In early 1972, John Hume and other nationalist politicians challenged their conviction under a regulation of the 1922 Civil Authorities (Special Powers) Act (Northern Ireland) that allowed any army officer to disperse an assembly of three or more people for the purpose of preserving public order. Lowry was one of three judges to find that the regulation was ultra vires under Section 4 of the Government of Ireland Act 1920, which forbade the Parliament of Northern Ireland from making laws in respect to the British Army, and the appeals were successful (R (Hume) v Londonderry Justices [1972] NI 91).

In 1973, after the Northern Ireland (Emergency Provisions) Act came into effect and "provided that a confession was admissible in evidence in a criminal trial unless it had been obtained by violence, torture, or inhuman treatment", Lowry held that the trial judge still retained a discretion under common law to exclude the confession if its admission would not be in the interests of justice.

Lowry did not exclude self-incriminating evidence alone as insufficient to convict upon, and in R v. Gorman he found that the Northern Ireland Act 1972 s. 1, by retrospectively validating the conferment of powers of arrest under the regulations, rendered lawful the otherwise unlawful arrest and subsequent detention of Gorman. Lowry was unable to implement Article 7 of the European Convention on Human Rights (ECHR) as it was not incorporated into UK law until the Human Rights Act 1998.

In 1975, Lowry was appointed by Merlyn Rees to chair the Northern Ireland Constitutional Convention, an unsuccessful attempt to replace the collapsed Sunningdale Agreement.

In 1980, Lowry partly excused the actions of two members of the Royal Ulster Constabulary (RUC) convicted of murder and bombing by stating they acted under the "powerful motive... that more than ordinary police work was justified to rid the land of the pestilence which had been in existence". This was criticised by the Historical Enquiries Team of the Police Service of Northern Ireland as "difficult to conceive of a statement more fundamentally flawed or calculated to destroy the confidence of a large section of the community in the court's independence and probity".

Lowry presided over Diplock court cases. He also presided over the supergrass trial in 1983 where Kevin McGrady, a former IRA member, gave evidence which led to the conviction of seven out of ten defendants. As a result, Lowry became an IRA target, narrowly missing death on at least three occasions. In 1982, having just survived a hail of IRA bullets, Lowry gave a planned lecture at Queen's University, Belfast.

Leading solicitor Paddy McGrory accused Lowry of disliking Jews as much as Catholics and of using his position to ensure "particular judges hear particular trials for the purpose of ensuring that the judgment serves his political end".

He was an honorary Bencher of the King's Inns, Dublin, and of the Middle Temple.

== Personal life ==
Lord Lowry married twice:

- Mary Martin (d. 1987), in 1948, with whom he had three daughters (Sheila, Anne and Margaret).
- Barbara Calvert, Lady Lowry QC, in 1994 (daughter of Albert Parker CBE). She died in 2015.

== See also ==
- List of Northern Ireland Members of the House of Lords

Legal offices
Preceded by John MacDermott	Lord Chief Justice of Northern Ireland; 1971–1989	Succeeded by Brian Hutton
