= Nonell =

Nonell is a surname. Notable people with the surname include:

- Carmen Nonell (born 1920), Spanish novelist
- Isidre Nonell (1872–1911), Spanish painter
- Lluís Nonell (1926–1982), Spanish actor

== See also ==
- Norell
