= December 1981 =

Month of 1981

<<	December 1981					>>
Su	Mo	Tu	We	Th	Fr	Sa
		1	2	3	4	5
6	7	8	9	10	11	12
13	14	15	16	17	18	19
20	21	22	23	24	25	26
27	28	29	30	31

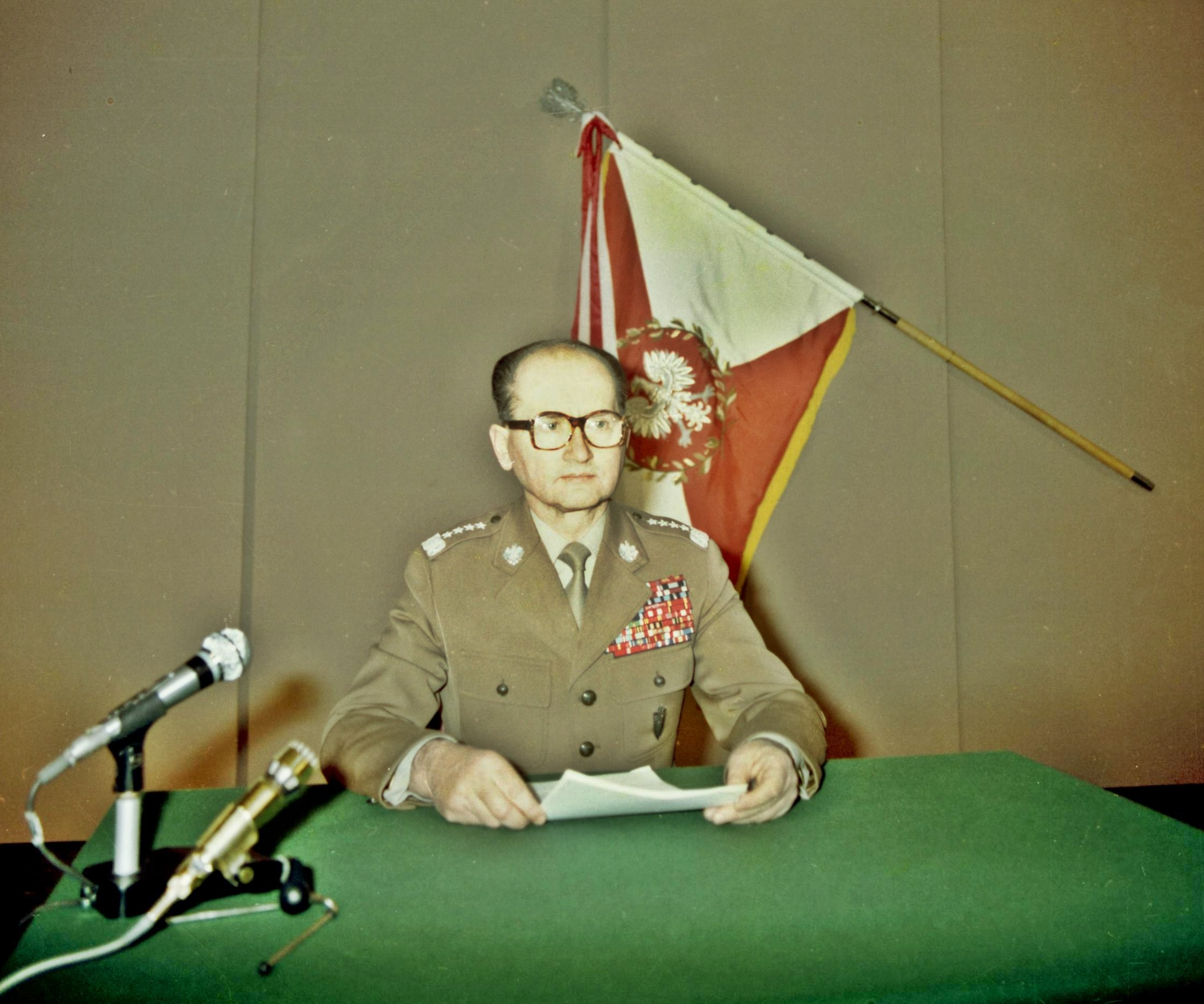
December 13, 1981: General Jaruzelski announces martial law in Poland

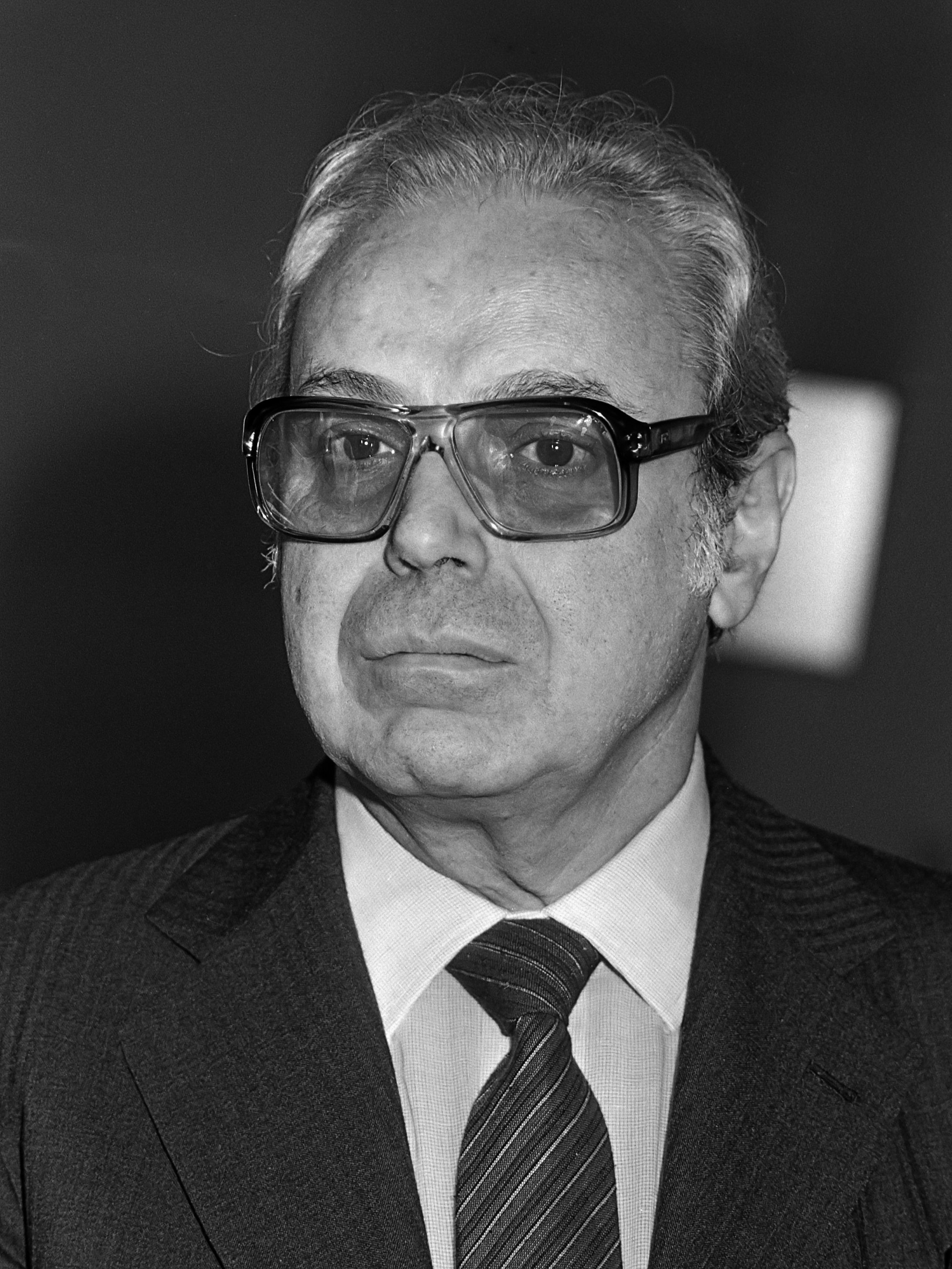
December 10, 1981: Pérez de Cuéllar elected new UN Secretary-General

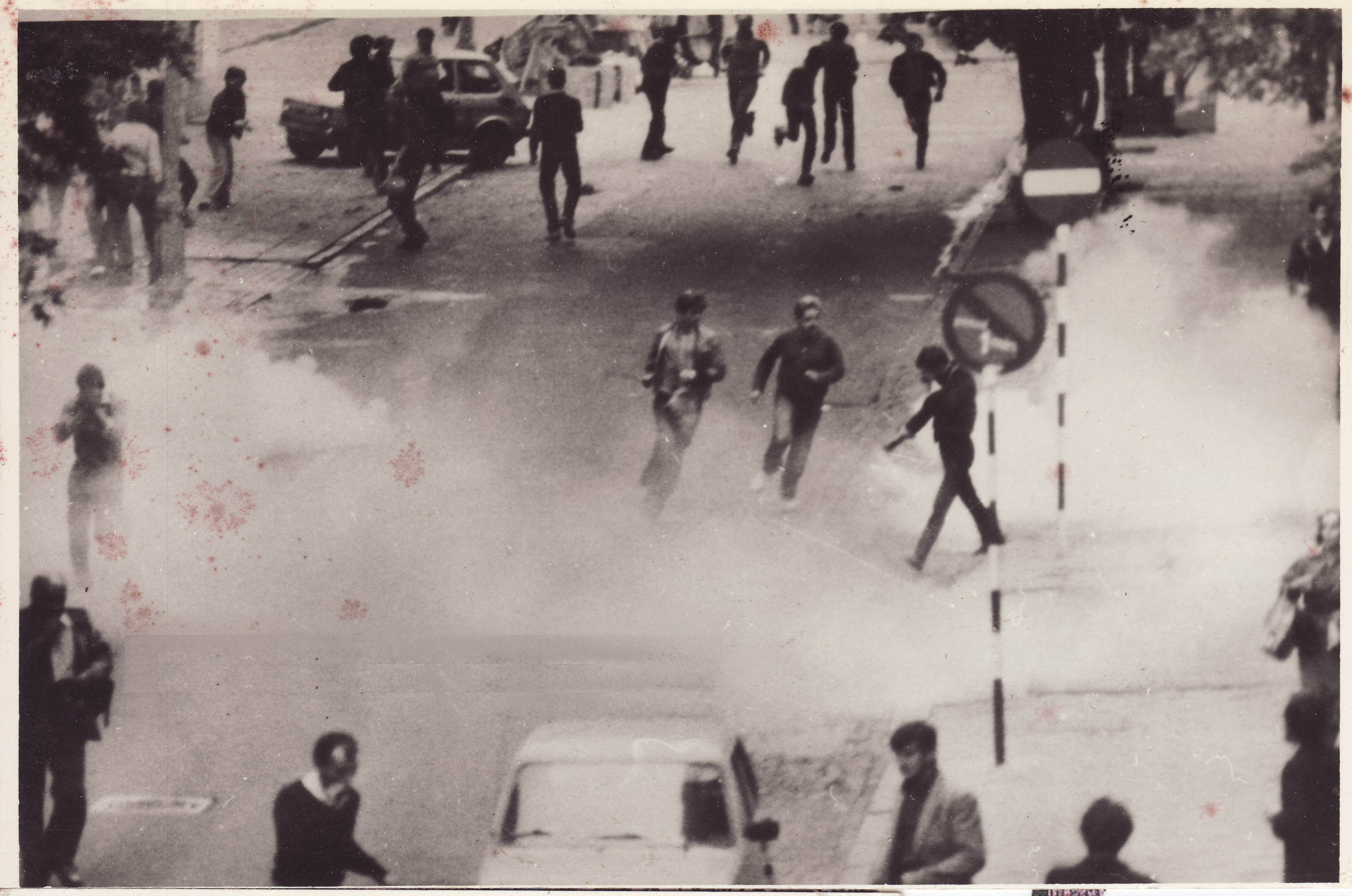
Poland's Army acts against Solidarity union

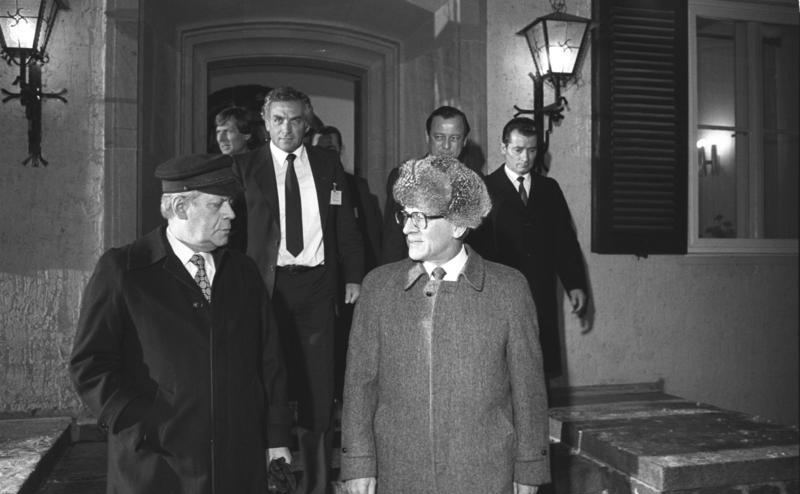
December 12, 1981: West Germany's Schmidt meets East Germany's Honecker in East Berlin

The following events occurred in December 1981:

== December 1, 1981 (Tuesday) ==
- Inex-Adria Aviopromet Flight 1308, a McDonnell Douglas MD-80 flying from Yugoslavia, crashed into the side of Mont San Pietro in Corsica while approaching Ajaccio, killing all 180 people on board. The group was on a one-day sightseeing trip.
- Beginning what would later be called the Iran-Contra scandal, U.S. President Ronald Reagan signed a Presidential Finding, secretly authorizing the CIA to provide direct assistance to Nicaragua's Contra rebels, led by Edén Pastora, in overthrowing the Sandinista government. A Congressional committee would cite the action later in a section entitled "Misuse of Findings", concluding that the President authorized more than had been reported to Congress.

== December 2, 1981 (Wednesday) ==
- Zayed bin Sultan Al Nahyan began his third term as the President of the United Arab Emirates as that nation celebrated the 10th anniversary of its founding. Zayed, who was also the Emir of Abu Dhabi and the first president of the UAE, would be re-elected every five years by the Supreme Council of the Federation, consisting of the seven monarchs who had agreed to unite in 1971. He would die in 2004, more than halfway through his seventh term.
- Born: Britney Spears, American singer and entertainer; in McComb, Mississippi
- Died: Hershy Kay, 62, American orchestrator for Broadway musicals.

== December 3, 1981 (Thursday) ==
- Tibetan dissident Lobsang Wangchuk was arrested in China after police found the manuscript and copies of a book he had written, A History of Tibetan Independence. Initially sentenced to 3 1/2 years in prison, the 67-year-old religious leader was given a death sentence, then had his term commuted to 18 years. He would die, still incarcerated, on November 4, 1987.
- Born:
  - Brian Bonsall, American TV actor; in Torrance, California
  - David Villa, Spanish national team footballer; in Langreo
- Died: Walter Knott, 91, American farmer who created the Knott's Berry Farm theme park

== December 4, 1981 (Friday) ==
Republic of Ciskei flag

- Dudley Wayne Kyzer, convicted of three murders, was sentenced to two life terms and 10,000 years in prison. The sentence, which was reported as a superlative in the Guinness Book of World Records was upheld on appeal, but Kyzer remained eligible for parole because Alabama law set the minimum at one-third of the sentence, or 10 years, whichever is less. Kyzer's most recent bid for parole was denied on August 3, 2010, with 3,371 years remaining on his sentence, and he will be eligible again in 2015.
- The Republic of Ciskei became the fourth "homeland" to be granted independence, joining Transkei, Bophuthatswana and Venda as independent nations for black residents of white-ruled South Africa. In the capital at Bisho, Chief Minister, and later President, Lennox Sebe, oversaw the ceremonies for the 2,100,000 Xhosa-speaking citizens of Ciskei, who were stripped of South African citizenship. No other nations recognized the independence of Ciskei, and the nation was abolished after South Africa attained black majority rule in 1994.
- A sudden power failure at the Qutab Minar tower in New Delhi caused a stampede of 300 tourists who ran for the exits in the dark. Forty-five people were killed and 24 injured.
- Executive Order 12333 was issued by President Reagan, grouping the various federal intelligence gathering agencies as the Intelligence Community. The Director of Central Intelligence, the CIA, the National Security Agency, the Defense Intelligence Agency, and seven other entities were brought under jurisdiction of the Community.
- Born: Bobbie Jo Stinnett, American crime victim; in Skidmore, Missouri (murdered 2004)

== December 5, 1981 (Saturday) ==
- Two years after directing the invasion and occupation of Cambodia, the leaders of Vietnam removed Pen Sovan as the Kampuchean Communist Party leader, and replaced him with Heng Samrin.
- On their way to perform a pregame show for a football game between the University of Hawaii and the University of South Carolina, 11 of the 12 members of the skydiving team Jump Hawaii were killed, along with their pilot, when the plane they were on went out of control and crashed into the East Loch of Pearl Harbor. One member of the team managed to parachute out as the plane crashed, while three others jumped but were too low to open their chutes.

== December 6, 1981 (Sunday) ==
- Interviewed by satellite in Tripoli by the ABC News program This Week With David Brinkley, Libya's President Muammar Gaddafi denied a U.S. State Department report that he had sent a "hit squad" to assassinate U.S. President Reagan. Speaking in English, Gaddafi said "We are sure we haven't sent any people to kill Reagan or any other people in the world... if they have evidence, we are ready to see this evidence." He added, "How you are silly people! You are superpower, how you are afraid? Oh, it is silly this administration, and this president." Despite rumors that a 5, 10 or 14 member death squad had landed in the U.S. the previous weekend, nothing was ever confirmed and no person was ever arrested or detained.
- At least 49 people were killed in Ahmedabad in India after "The Gabbar", a five-story high wood and canvas model of the Himalayan mountains, caught fire while the group of more than 100 was at the top level.

== December 7, 1981 (Monday) ==
- Manufacture of the Lockheed L-1011 TriStar, Lockheed's wide-body jumbo jet, was discontinued after only eight new orders for the $50,000,000 planes were placed in 1981, and three of those later cancelled. Lockheed Chairman Roy A. Anderson announced that the last of 21 contracts for manufacture would be finished by 1984.
- Eight coal miners were killed in an explosion at the Adkins Coal Company Mine No. 18 near Topmost, Kentucky.

== December 8, 1981 (Tuesday) ==
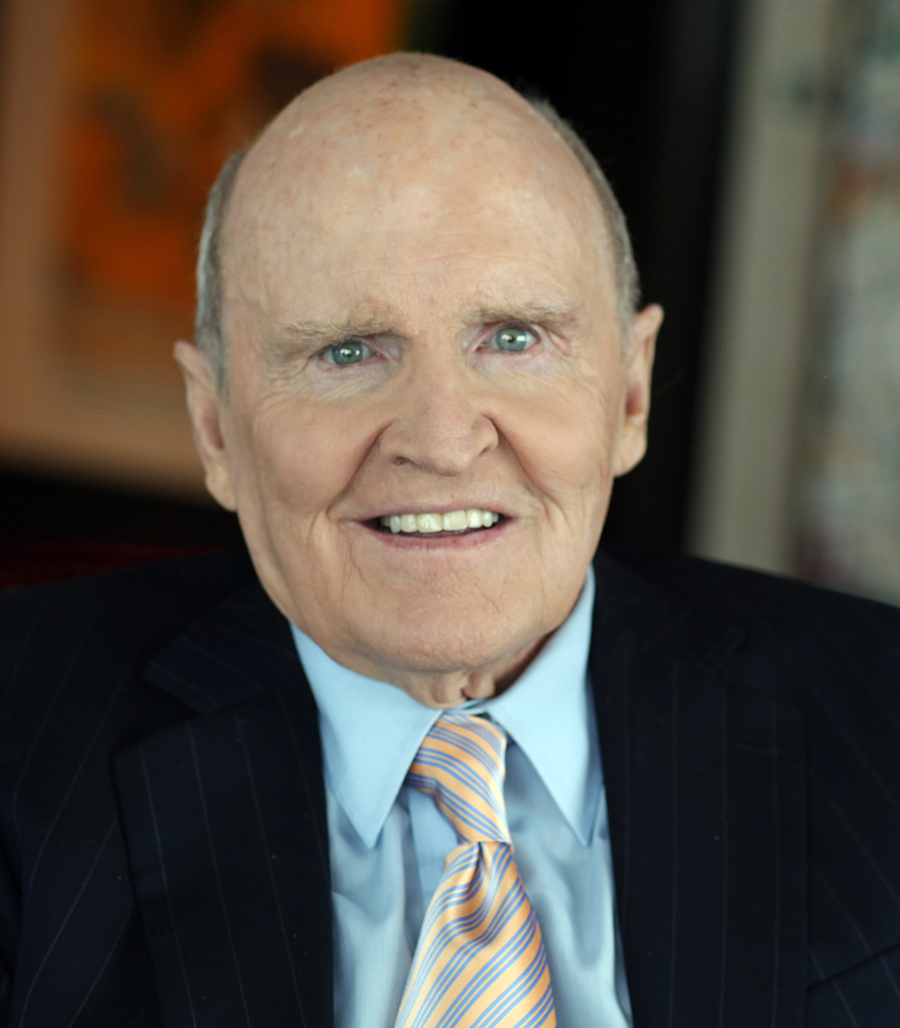
Jack Welch

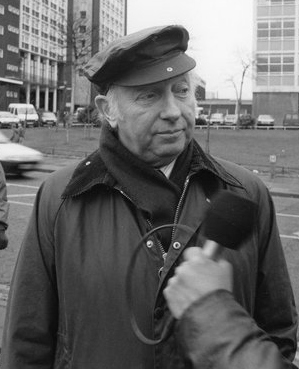
Arthur Scargill

- General Electric CEO Jack Welch delivered an address to Wall Street analysts at The Pierre hotel in New York, which has been described as a speech "that was to have enormous consequences for U.S. business and the U.S economy over the next three decades." The vision, outlined in "Growing Fast in a Slow-Growth Economy", was to get rid of any subsidiary in which GE wasn't number one, or at least second. Within four years, GE fired 112,000 of more than 411,000 employees, and annually terminated 10% of its executives who had the worst records, while steadily increasing revenues, and other corporations followed the strategy.
- One day after the mining disaster in Kentucky, 13 coal miners were killed in an explosion at Tennessee Consolidated Coal Company Mine No. 21 in Whitwell, Tennessee.
- Arthur Scargill was elected President of Britain's National Union of Mineworkers, receiving 70% of the votes cast in the race to succeed outgoing NUM President Joe Gormley.
- As labor unrest continued in Poland, 100,000 Soviet troops massed along the nations' common border, apparently poised for an invasion if the crisis continued.

== December 9, 1981 (Wednesday) ==
- Mumia Abu-Jamal, formerly Wesley Cook, was arrested after he shot and killed Philadelphia police officer Daniel Faulkner. After writing his own book from prison, Live from Death Row (Addison-Wesley, 1995), Abu-Jamal would be called by some "the world's most renowned political prisoner".

== December 10, 1981 (Thursday) ==
- Javier Pérez de Cuéllar of Peru was nominated as the fifth Secretary-General of the United Nations by the U.N. Security Council, which approved his nomination 10–1, with four abstentions, one of the latter being that of China. It was later learnt that it had been Tunisia which had cast the negative vote. Pérez de Cuéllar was in fact the only one of several candidates whose candidacy had not been vetoed by at least one of the five permanent members of the Security Council. On the first 18 ballots, incumbent Kurt Waldheim of Austria, was repeatedly vetoed by China in his bid for a third five-year term, while Tanzanian Foreign Minister Salim Salim was blocked by U.S. vetoes. Sadruddin Aga Khan was runner up to Pérez de Cuéllar but a 9–2 vote in his favor included one veto among the no votes, that of the Soviet Union. The General Assembly approved Javier Pérez de Cuéllar by acclamation the next day.
- Spain was accepted as a member of the North Atlantic Treaty Organization (NATO) after signing the Protocol of Accession in Brussels.

== December 11, 1981 (Friday) ==
- In El Salvador, army units killed 900 civilians, including women and children, in three towns, with more than half (482) shot in the town of El Mozote. More than a decade later, investigators found 143 skeletons buried at the town, and estimated that 85% of them had been children under 14.
- At the age of 39, former world champion Muhammad Ali participated in his last professional boxing bout and lost in a unanimous decision, after ten rounds in the fight with Trevor Berbick, in Nassau, The Bahamas.
- The U.S. Department of State effectively banned travel by Americans to Libya, directing that U.S. passports were not to be used to go there.
- Lt. General Roberto Viola, who had been on sick leave from his job as President of Argentina since November 21, was dismissed by the three-man military junta that had placed him in power. The Interior Minister, Horacio Liendo, had been serving as acting president during Viola's absence. The junta temporarily put Rear Admiral Carlos Lacoste as president for 10 days, until the junta leader, General Leopoldo Galtieri, assumed the office on December 22.
- Born: Javier Saviola, Argentine soccer player; in Buenos Aires

== December 12, 1981 (Saturday) ==
- Meeting in Gdańsk, the national commission of the Polish independent union Solidarity discussed lobbying for a referendum to set up multiparty elections in the Polish People's Republic. By then, police across the nation had been informed by the government that the first phase of arrests would begin at 11:30 pm. At 11:57 pm, all 3.4 million private telephones in Poland were cut off.
- Dmitri Donskoi, the first of the Soviet Union's Typhoon-class submarines and the largest sub that had been built up to that time, was commissioned. The previous largest submarine to be commissioned had been USS Ohio, first of the Ohio-class submarines, which had been commissioned a month earlier, on November 11, 1981.
- West Germany's Chancellor Helmut Schmidt visited East Germany, where he was welcomed by SED First Secretary Erich Honecker, who proclaimed in a toast, "Whatever differences may exist between our countries, either politically or socially, we cannot and must not permit ourselves to be pulled away from our responsibility to the people of Europe.
- Died:
  - Queen Khamphoui of Laos, 69, former Queen Consort of King Savang Vatthana who had ruled from 1959 to 1975, died in a Communist re-education camp. She was preceded in death by her husband and her son, former Crown Prince Vong Savang, who had died in the internment camp at Sop Hao in 1979.
  - Charles P. Alexander, American entomologist who cataloged over 10,000 species of insects, primarily crane flies in the genus Tipula, during his career.

== December 13, 1981 (Sunday) ==
- Going on television and radio at 6:00 in the morning, General Wojciech Jaruzelski informed viewers and listeners that he had declared martial law in Poland, although he used the phrase stan wojenny 'a state of war'. The army and police arrested thousands of members of the independent union Solidarity.
- Flamengo of Brazil defeated Liverpool FC of England, 3 to 0, to win the Intercontinental Cup, the annual meeting of the champion soccer football clubs of South America and of Europe. João Batista Nunes scored two of Flamengo's goals in the first half, while Raul Plassmann blocked all of Liverpool's shots at goal. Flamengo had beaten Cobreloa of Chile to win the 1981 Copa Libertadores Finals in November, while Liverpool had won the 1981 European Cup Final in May, beating Real Madrid of Spain, 1 to 0. The game was played in Japan before a crowd of 62,000 people in Tokyo.
- In the United Kingdom, temperatures fell to −25.2C (−13.4F) at Shawbury, Shropshire. This was the lowest temperature in the UK since February 1895, and the lowest recorded in England. This record would be broken just 28 days later.
- Born:
  - Mathis Bailey, American-born Canadian novelist and fiction writer; in Detroit
  - Amy Lee, American singer-songwriter and musician for the band Evanescence; in Riverside, California
- Died: Dewey "Pigmeat" Markham, 77, African-American comedian

== December 14, 1981 (Monday) ==
- Fourteen years after its capture from Syria in the Six-Day War, the Golan Heights was annexed to Israel by a 63–21 vote of the Knesset. The Ramat Hagolan Law declared that "the law, jurisdiction and administration of the State of Israel will apply in the territory of the Golan Heights".
- Died: Victor Kugler, 81, Dutch businessman who hid his business partner Otto Frank and family, including Anne Frank above his Amsterdam offices for 25 months

== December 15, 1981 (Tuesday) ==
- The first suicide car bombing was carried out, destroying Iraq's embassy in, Beirut, Lebanon and killing 61 people, including Ambassador Abdul Razzak Lafta. Although car bombs had been set off before, and although suicide bombers had used cars before to drive to a target, the Beirut attack involved packing a vehicle with explosives and detonating them while driving.
- Argentina's Chief of Naval Operations, Juan Jose Lombardo, was asked by junta leader Galtieri to draw up plans to recapture the Falkland Islands from the United Kingdom. Lombardo's proposal was completed in five days.
- Born:
  - Roman Pavlyuchenko, Russian soccer football player; in Mostovskoy, Russian SFSR, Soviet Union
  - Thomas Herrion, American NFL player who died shortly after a game; in Fort Worth, Texas; (d. 2005)
- Died:
  - Catherine T. MacArthur, 71, American philanthropist
  - Karl Struss, 95, American cinematographer

== December 16, 1981 (Wednesday) ==
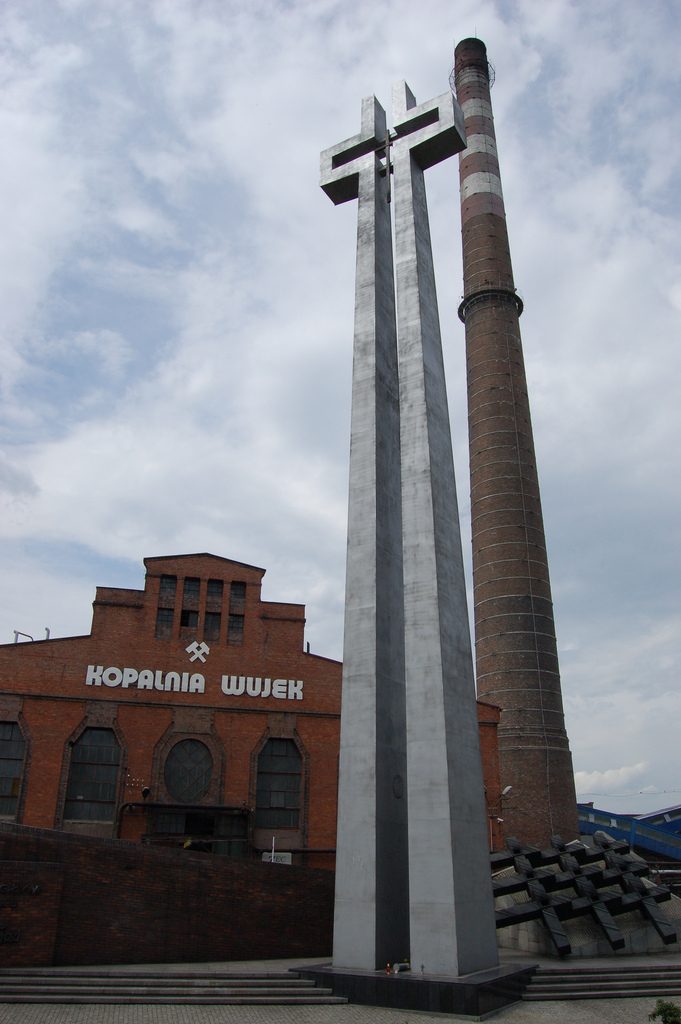
Memorial at Wujek Mine

- The "pacification of Wujek" took place three days after martial law had gone into effect, as riot police in Poland broke up a sit-down strike by 2,000 workers at the Wujek coal mine in Katowice. The police brought in tanks and fired into the crowd, even shooting at emergency workers attempting to render aid. In the fighting, nine miners and four ZOMO police were killed. A 100-foot tall concrete cross was erected ten years later to commemorate the deaths, and 25 years after the shootings, former ZOMO commander Romuald Cieslak and 14 officers were sentenced to prison.

== December 17, 1981 (Thursday) ==
- Brigadier General James L. Dozier, one of the highest ranking U.S. Army officers stationed in Italy was kidnapped from his apartment in Verona by the terrorist group the Red Brigades. Four men posing as plumbers, led by Antonio Savasta, took Dozier hostage and held him for ransom in an apartment in Padua. A special Italian counter-terrorist team rescued Dozier on January 28, 1982.
- The Confederation of Senegambia agreement signed at Dakar, Senegal, effective February 1982, with Gambia's president as the Senegambian vice-president, and a legislature that had two-thirds of the seats for Senegalese deputies. The Confederation would be dissolved on September 1, 1989
- The Emergency Mobilization Preparedness Board was established in the United States by order of President Reagan.
- Four veterans of the Vietnam War (Robert U. Muller, Michael Harbert, Tom Bird and John Terzano) became the first Americans to visit Vietnam since the Communist victory there, arriving in Hanoi as guests of the Communist government.
- Died:
  - Mehmet Shehu, 68, Prime Minister of Albania since 1954. The previous day, Albania's leader Enver Hoxha bitterly denounced Shehu at a meeting of the Politburo of the Albanian Communist Party, after Shehu refused to resign in favor of Ramiz Alia. Albanian newspapers and radio announced that Shehu had committed suicide because of a "nervous crisis".
  - Edwin Erich Dwinger, 83, German novelist

== December 18, 1981 (Friday) ==
- Four days after Israel annexed the Golan Heights, the U.S. terminated its recently made Memorandum of Understanding (MOU) with Israel. The MOU was not reinstated until May 17, 1983.
- Robert Patlescu, 19 months old, fell from his parents' apartment on the 6th floor of a building in Manhattan. His fall was broken by shrubbery, and he landed in soft mud, surviving with no broken bones or even a scratch.
- Tom Brokaw signed off from The Today Show, for the last time as co-anchor on NBC. Bryant Gumbel would succeed him as anchor in January 1982. Brokaw would go on to anchor NBC Nightly News, with Roger Mudd, for most of 1982 before becoming sole anchor.
- Died:
  - Eugene Conley, 73, American operatic tenor and lead singer for the Metropolitan Opera
  - Albert Deutscher, 61, member of the Selbstschutz, a Nazi paramilitary group that had carried out the mass murder of hundreds of Jewish civilians in Ukraine. Deutscher moved to the U.S. and became a naturalized citizen in 1957. The day after a petition was filed to revoke his citizenship, he was killed by a train.

== December 19, 1981 (Saturday) ==
- In the Penlee lifeboat disaster, 16 people died in the worst British sea accident since 1946. The Union Star, with a crew of eight, was on its maiden voyage when a hurricane drove it onto the rocks at Cornwall. Eight volunteers from the town of Mousehole guided the lifeboat Solomon Browne to the scene and rescued four people. Before the others could be pulled to safety, the waves drove the Union Star into the lifeboat, and everyone was killed as both boats capsized.
- The Tupolev Tu-160 "Blackjack" long range strategic bomber was first flown. The airplane was put into production in 1986, but discontinued in 1992 after the Cold War had ended.
- New York Giants placekicker Joe Danelo kicked a 35-yard field goal with 8:41 left in overtime to give The Giants a 13–10 victory over the Dallas Cowboys. The next day The Green Bay Packers lost to the New York Jets giving the Giants their first National Football League playoff berth since 1963.
- Dwight Braxton (later Dwight Muhammad Qawi) defeated Matthew Saad Muhammad to win the WBC light heavyweight boxing championship.
- Archbishop Luigi Poggi visited Polish General Jaruzelski and delivered a personal appeal from Pope John Paul II, asking that further bloodshed be avoided during the implementation of martial law.
- The Kingdom of Spain adopted a new national coat of arms, and a new flag displaying the symbol.
- Died: Selma Fraiberg, 63, American child psychologist and advocate

old flag

new flag

== December 20, 1981 (Sunday) ==
- Dreamgirls, directed and choreographed by Michael Bennett, premiered on Broadway at the Imperial Theater. It would win six Tony awards and run for 1,521 performances.
- "In the Land of the Khmer Rouge", by Christopher Jones, was published as the cover story for the New York Times Magazine, as the investigative reporter described a month with guerillas fighting against the Vietnamese in Cambodia. Less than a month later, Alexander Cockburn of The Village Voice noted that parts of the report had been plagiarized from the André Malraux novel The Royal Way, and began questioning the story. By February, the New York Times had to concede that it had been the victim of a hoax.
- At a cabinet meeting convened by Prime Minister Menahem Begin, Israel's Defense Minister Ariel Sharon first presented the contingency plan for an invasion of Lebanon to drive out the Palestine Liberation Organization from its neighbor to the north. Many of the ministers were shocked at the plans to begin a war, and no vote was taken at that time on whether to approve the plan. The operation was given the go ahead the following year.
- The communications satellite Marisat was successfully launched into geosynchronous orbit from French Guiana in the fourth test of the Ariane rocket.
- Poland's Ambassador to the United States, Romuald Spasowski, defected. Two days later, he was welcomed at the White House by President Reagan.

== December 21, 1981 (Monday) ==
- The treaty creating the Common Market for Eastern and Southern Africa (COMESA) was signed in Zambia at Lusaka by representatives from 15 nations. The agreement would become effective on September 30, 1982.
- In a college basketball game in Peoria, Illinois, the University of Cincinnati defeated Bradley University, 75–73 after an NCAA Division I record of seven periods of overtime. Cincinnati had tied the game 61–61 after being down by four points with 0:45 left in regulation. The 40 minute game then continued for 35 more minutes until Doug Schlomer scored the winning basket with :01 left to end the game. The only other equally long games were in Division II (February 18, 1956, as Black Hills State College defeated Yankton College, 80–79) and in Division III (November 23, 2010 as Skidmore College beat Southern Vermont College, 128–123).

== December 22, 1981 (Tuesday) ==
- The Corporate Angel Network, a program where unused space on corporate jets is donated for worthy causes, made its first flight, transporting a young boy from White Plains to Detroit for surgery.
- The Union Pacific Railroad acquired the Western Pacific Railroad.
- Army General Leopoldo Galtieri took the oath of office as President of Argentina, replacing Robert E. Viola who was removed from office on December 11 after serving 8 months.

== December 23, 1981 (Wednesday) ==
- U.S. President Reagan wrote to Soviet General Secretary (and, as President of the Presidium, Soviet head of state) Brezhnev on the direct communications link between the two nations, to urge an end to the Polish martial law. "The recent events in Poland clearly are not an 'internal matter'," Reagan told Brezhnev, "and in writing to you, as the head of the Soviet government, I am not misaddressing my communication." That evening, Reagan announced sanctions against Poland in a televised address to Americans. Reagan's letter was declassified in 1995.
- In Nicaragua, soldiers of the Sandinista regime massacred 75 miners who had been demanding back wages for work unpaid.
- Died:
  - Samuel L. Kountz, 51, African-American scientist who perfected successful kidney transplantation, died of a brain disease contracted while on tour in South Africa earlier in the year.
  - Reg Ansett, 72, Australian businessman and aviator
  - Luther Harris Evans, 79, Librarian of Congress from 1949 to 1953.

== December 24, 1981 (Thursday) ==
- The Inland Navigation Rules took effect on all inland waterways of the United States except for the Great Lakes, which were covered effective March 1, 1983.
- Tainted eggnog at a Christmas Eve party fatally poisoned five residents of the Shady Lane a nursing home in Clarksboro, New Jersey, and caused 120 residents and staff to become seriously ill. The outbreak of salmonella, traced to the use of raw eggs for preparing the home-made eggnog, and failure of the preparers to wash their hands before touching other food to be served to the residents. Symptoms became noticeable on Christmas Day, and the first two victims died on December 29, followed by a third on New Year's Day and two more by January 6.
- Born: Dima Bilan, Russian pop-singer; in Ust-Dzheguta

== December 25, 1981 (Friday) ==
- On Christmas morning, Soviet General Secretary Brezhnev responded directly to U.S. President Reagan, asking him "to end at last the interference in the internal affairs of a sovereign state... Essentially, in your current communication, you have placed your personal signature upon the fact that gross interference in the internal affairs of Poland is the official policy of the United States. We have condemned and continue to condemn such a policy. We consider it unacceptable."
- The Central Committee of the Chinese Communist Party reversed a prior endorsement of economic reforms by Premier Zhao Ziyang, who had advocated western-style management and economic incentives to motivate workers. The CCP declared that the stated policy of Mao Zedong of "putting politics in command of industry", had been correct, and cited the Daqing oilfields as a model for industrial development.
- Died:
  - Heinrich Welker, 69, German scientist who co-invented the "transistron", a form of transistor, independently of that invented by William Shockley and others
  - Wallace Pratt, 96, American pioneer in petroleum geology.

== December 26, 1981 (Saturday) ==
- The College of Saint Thomas More was founded in Fort Worth, Texas as a small Roman Catholic liberal arts college.

== December 27, 1981 (Sunday) ==
- In cricket, bowler Dennis Lillee tied and then broke the record that had been set by Lance Gibbs for most Test wickets in a career, getting his 310th wicket (analogous to a strikeout thrown by a baseball pitcher) in Test cricket play. Bowling for Australia in the second game of a Test match against the West Indies, Lillee set the new record at Melbourne while bowling to Larry Gomes. Lillee finished his career in 1984 with 355 Test wickets, a mark surpassed by Ian Botham of England in 1986.
- Born:
  - Emilie de Ravin, Australian actress; in Mount Eliza, Victoria
  - Yuvraj Singh, Indian cricketer; in Chandigarh
- Died: Hoagy Carmichael, 82 American jazz composer

== December 28, 1981 (Monday) ==
- Elizabeth Jordan Carr became the first American "test-tube baby", and 25th in history, at her birth at 7:46 pm in Norfolk, Virginia. She had been conceived by in vitro fertilization in the laboratory at Bourn in England; coincidentally, Elizabeth's birth weight was 2.61 kilograms, precisely the weight of the first test-tube baby, Louise Brown, in 1978
- Born:
  - Sienna Miller, American-born British film actress; in New York City
  - Khalid Boulahrouz, Dutch footballer; in Maassluis.
- Died: Allan Dwan, 96, Canadian-born film director

== December 29, 1981 (Tuesday) ==
- Romanian dictator Nicolae Ceaușescu ordered demolition to begin in Bucharest in order to make way for construction of the massive Boulevard of the Victory of Socialism Complex. Thousands of homes, apartment buildings, churches and other buildings were razed to satisfy Ceaușescu's obsession to build the world's largest governmental building and the Boulevard itself, with more demolished after construction of the complex began in 1984.
- The Senegambian Confederation was ratified unanimously by the National Assembly of Senegal and by the Gambian National Assembly on the same day. Senegambia came into existence on February 1, 1982, and lasted for seven years.
- U.S. District Judge Alcee Hastings was indicted for conspiracy to accept a $150,000 bribe. Acquitted in 1983, he remained in office until October 20, 1989, when the U.S. Senate convicted him 69–26 in an impeachment trial. He was elected to Congress in 1992.
- After reviewing Soviet General Secretary Brezhnev's letter of December 25, President Reagan followed up trade sanctions against Poland with an embargo on trade with the Soviet Union.
- Forrest Gregg, the man who revived the Cincinnati Bengals franchise with a 12-4 AFC Central Division Championship was named the United Press International's AFC Coach of the Year. Don Shula of the Miami Dolphins was second in the voting, and Dan Reeves of the Denver Broncos was placed third.
- Born: Shizuka Arakawa, Japanese figure skater, 2004 World Champion and 2006 Olympic gold medalist; in Shinagawa
- Died: Miroslav Krleža, 88, Croatian and Yugoslavian writer

== December 30, 1981 (Wednesday) ==
- Wayne Gretzky had scored 45 goals in 38 NHL games, and was on his way to breaking the record of 50 goals in 50 games that had been set by Maurice Richard and Mike Bossy, when his Edmonton Oilers visited the Philadelphia Flyers. As the audience watched, Gretzky scored five goals in Edmonton's 7–5 win, hitting the fifth with 0:01 to play. Gretzky would finish the season with 92 goals.
- Asturias became an autonomous community of Spain on December 30, 1981, within the decentralized territorial structure established by the Constitution of 1978.

== December 31, 1981 (Thursday) ==
- Flight Lieutenant Jerry Rawlings led a coup d'état for the second time in Ghana, removing President Hilla Limann. Rawlings went on the air on Ghanaian radio at 11:00 am to announce that the Provisional National Defence Council would lead the nation until order could be restored.
- At 11:30 pm local time (4:00 pm UTC), clocks were adjusted 30 minutes forward to midnight on the Malaysian peninsula, including its largest city, Kuching, to match the time in the rest of Malaysia, changing a system that had existed since the end of World War Two.
- Cable News Network 2, later called CNN Headline News and now HLN, first appeared on American cable television.
- Born: Francisco Garcia, the first Dominican Republic NBA player; in Santo Domingo
