= Michael Michael =

Criminal and informant

Michael Michael is the ex-boss of a criminal empire called the Organisation which was involved in drug smuggling, prostitution and money laundering. Following his arrest, Michael turned supergrass/police informer, with his evidence leading to 34 people being jailed for a combined 170 years, and the dismantling of 26 different drug syndicates.

Among people he informed on were his wife Lynn, given a 24-month prison sentence suspended for two years for her role as a cash courier; and Janice Marlborough, his business lieutenant who ran his string of brothels. Michael's evidence led to drugs worth £49m being recovered from a distribution network that is thought to have smuggled more than 110 kg (250lb) of cocaine and 19 tonnes of cannabis into Britain.

Information about Michael's work as an informer remained secret until December 2001, when a judge at Woolwich Crown Court sentenced him to six years in jail. Reporting restrictions that had been in place for three years were lifted. Michael had admitted one count of conspiracy to import cocaine, a similar charge involving cannabis, and three conspiracies to launder the proceeds. He has also pleaded guilty to possessing a firearm. Michael, who lived in Radlett, Hertfordshire, is thought to have been given a new identity under the terms of the witness protection programme.

Born into a Greek-Cypriot family in Birmingham in the English Midlands, Michael's birth name was Constantine Michael Michael, but he decided to drop the use of the forename Constantine in adulthood.
