= Assisting offender =

An assisting offender is a suspected or convicted criminal in the United Kingdom, who has agreed to assist the investigation or prosecution of other on their own criminal history.

In the United Kingdom the use of assisting offenders is enabled by the Serious Organised Crime and Police Act 2005 (SOCPA), the relevant sections of which came into force in 2006. The relevant sections are:

== Immunity ==
Section 71 of the SOCPA allows a specified prosecutor to grant an assisting offender immunity from prosecution.

== Restricted use undertaking ==
Section 72 of the SOCPA allows a specified prosecutor to grant an undertaking to an assisting offender that information will not be used against that person. It is a form of limited immunity.

== Reduced sentence ==
Section 73 of the SOCPA allows a specified prosecutor to sign an agreement with the assisting offender that the assistance of the offender will be brought to the attention of a court in order to allow the court to pass a reduced sentence on the assisting offender.

== Review of sentence ==
Section 74 of the SOCPA allows a specified prosecutor to seek a review of a previously sentenced prisoner who has entered an agreement to assist the prosecution or investigation of other criminals in exchange for a reduced sentence.

== Use of legislation ==
The 2005 legislation placed the use of so-called "supergrasses" onto a statutory footing.

Assisting offenders have been used in some notable cases with mixed results. In 2007 Rhys Jones was shot dead in Liverpool as part of a gang related incident. One of the suspects was later arrested in possession of a firearm and became an assisting offender, giving evidence for the prosecution. In Northern Ireland the use of assisting offenders was heavily criticised when the trial of 13 men for a range of terrorist crimes ended with only one conviction after a trial that had cost £11.5 million
