= Kevin McGrady =

IRA member (born 1956)

- Born: 1956 (age 69–70); Belfast, Northern Ireland
- Military career
- Allegiance: Provisional IRA
- Rank: Volunteer
- Unit: Belfast Brigade
- Conflict: The Troubles

Kevin McGrady (born 1956) is a former Provisional IRA member who became an informer in 1982 following his conversion to born again Christianity. As a result of evidence provided by McGrady, seven people were convicted at the supergrass trial presided over by Northern Ireland's Lord Chief Justice Robert Lowry.

== IRA member ==
Kevin McGrady was born into a Roman Catholic family in Belfast in 1956, one of seven children. He grew up in the staunch nationalist Markets area of the city. He trained as a butcher after he left school, and joined the IRA's Belfast Brigade in 1975 at the age of 19, due to his identification with the Republican cause and distrust of the majority Protestant community. McGrady claimed to have participated in his first operation in July 1975, and had gone on the run in October of that same year. McGrady was held in custody from December 1975 to June 1976 for assaulting a police officer during an interrogation. Following his release, McGrady moved to London where he spent 18 months, and then moved to Amsterdam, the Netherlands where he obtained work in a hotel. It was in Amsterdam in March 1978 that he underwent a religious conversion and became a born-again Christian. He joined Youth with a Mission, an American-based Christian organisation, and became actively involved in their projects.

== Supergrass ==
McGrady came under the influence of Floyd McClung, a leading member of the religious organisation who persuaded McGrady that to make progress within the organisation, he had to "repent of his past sins" by returning to Belfast and confessing to the Royal Ulster Constabulary about his previous IRA activities. Following McClung's advice, McGrady returned to Northern Ireland and on 12 January 1982, he entered Musgrave Street Police station and made his confession to the police, admitting to IRA-related offences. He was arrested and sent to Crumlin Road Prison. Between 14 January and 24 May 1982 during many lengthy interviews with the police, he made ten written statements relating to the crimes he had committed in 1975. On 26 June 1982, he pleaded guilty to 27 counts including the murders in 1975 of three Protestants, Andrew Craig (20), William Stephenson (38) and Ernest Dowds (21), and four attempted murders. He was sentenced to life imprisonment, but would end up serving six years. Ernest Dowds and Andrew Craig were both members of the Ulster Defence Association (UDA), which was the largest Loyalist paramilitary group in Northern Ireland. In separate incidents, before each man had been shot in the head, Stephenson and Craig were interrogated by McGrady and other IRA members at a Markets social club. McGrady had been in charge of the "grilling". Ernest Dowds was gunned down on 10 October 1975 on his way to work in the Ormeau Road area of South Belfast.

McGrady had another reason for returning to Belfast which was to secure the release of his brother, Sean who was in prison for his part in the murder of Ernest Dowds. Kevin had insisted that it was he who had perpetrated the killing, and that Sean had played no part in the crime; however when Sean McGrady appealed his murder conviction, he was unsuccessful, despite Kevin's evidence.

In exchange for the shortening of his sentence, McGrady was persuaded by the police to become an informer and provide names of fellow IRA members.

The supergrass trial in which McGrady was the star witness, was the third such trial in Northern Ireland. It began on 5 May 1983 with ten defendants and 45 indictments including a conspiracy to murder the former Chief Constable of the RUC, Sir James Flanagan. It was presided over by Northern Ireland's Lord Chief Justice Robert Lowry. The trial when it ended on 26 October 1983, secured the conviction of seven out of the ten defendants named by McGrady, despite McGrady's numerous inconsistencies and mistakes as well as Lord Lowry's description of McGrady's evidence as having been "bizarre, incredible and contradictory". One of those convicted solely on the basis of McGrady's testimony was Sinn Féin's former national organiser Jim Gibney who spent six years in prison for possession with intent, wounding, and IRA membership.

Other notable supergrass trials of that period were those of IRA informer Christopher Black and Loyalist Ulster Volunteer Force informer Joseph Bennett. Black's testimony secured the conviction of 35 defendants, and Bennett's evidence secured the conviction of 14 senior members out of the 16 defendants accused of UVF-related crimes.

In 2006, McGrady's brother John was convicted of murdering and dismembering a young woman in London. He had a previous record for sex offences.
