= Sasthamkotta boat disaster =

1982 boat disaster in Kerala, India

The Sasthamcotta boat disaster occurred on 16 January 1982 on Sasthamcotta Lake, located in the Kollam district of the southern Indian state of Kerala. The tragedy claimed the lives of 24 individuals.

Of the 24 people who died, 22 were residents of Vilantara village of West Kallada. As soon as the boat reached the middle of the lake, it began to sink due to overcrowding and poor weather conditions. Seeing this, another boat came from the shore. Those on the first boat moved to the second boat causing both to sink.
