= Teatro Princesa =

Theatre and cinema in Valencia, Spain

Coordinates: 39.4753°N 0.3812°W

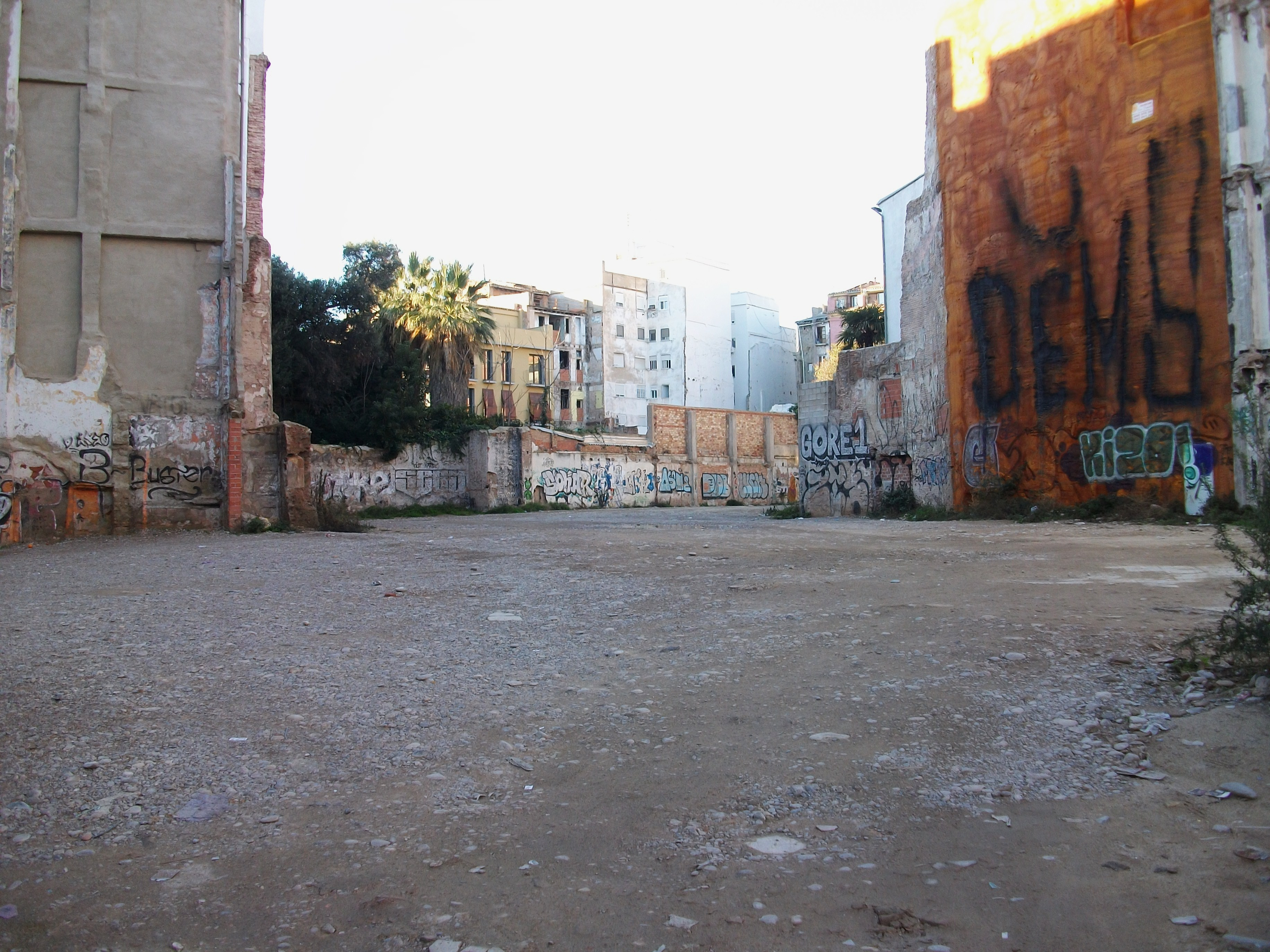
The empty lot where Teatro Princesa once stood

Teatro Princesa (English: Princess Theatre) was a theater in Valencia, Spain. Actor Lluís Nonell died during the play El diluvio que viene on 30 January 1982 from a sudden cardiac death.

== History ==
It was designed by architect Jose Zacarias Camaña and opened in 1853. During the Spanish Civil War it was called Teatro Libertad. It was remodeled in 1956 by Miguel Sanchis.

The building was abandoned by 1990. In October 1999 it was occupied by squatters but was then evicted by the Policía Nacional. On 27 February 2009 it was destroyed by a fire.
