= Lee Seung-gun =

South Korean businessman (born 1982)

- 이승건
- Born: January 30, 1982 (age 44); Seoul, South Korea
- Education: Seoul National University (bachelor)
- Occupation: Businessman
- Employer: Viva Republica

Korean name
- Hangul: 이승건
- RR: I Seunggeon
- MR: I Sŭnggŏn

Lee Seung-gun (Korean: 이승건; born January 30, 1982) is a South Korean businessman and dentist. The founder and chairman of the financial services company Viva Republica, he is among the richest people in South Korea. In April 2024, Forbes estimated his net worth at US$1.05 billion and ranked him 38th richest in the country.

== Biography ==
He was born in Seoul, South Korea on January 30, 1982. In 2001, he graduated from Youngdong High School. In 2007 he graduated from Seoul National University's School of Dentistry. At age 27, he completed his compulsory military service as a public health doctor in South Jeolla Province. Soon after he was discharged, he became interested in technology and entrepreneurship.

In 2007, he began his residency in Samsung Medical Center. He worked in a public health role in 2008. He worked part time as a dentist; he would spend the rest of his time developing app products, all of which failed. In 2015, he finally succeeded with the app Toss, which streamlined transfers of funds.

In 2013, he founded Viva Republica. In June 2021, Viva Republica raised more than US$400 million in a financing round, after which the company became valued at US$7.4 billion. This made him a billionaire, due to his stake in the company.

According to Lee, he had difficulty in convincing his parents to allow him to pivot from dentistry to entrepreneurship. It was reported in 2024 that he was unmarried.
