= Arturo Durazo Moreno =

Mexican police chief and criminal (1924–2000)

- Born: October 19, 1918; Cumpas, Sonora, Mexico
- Died: August 5, 2000 (aged 81); Acapulco, Guerrero, Mexico
- Other name: El Negro
- Status: Deceased
- Criminal charges: Drug trafficking, corruption, extortion
- Penalty: 16 years in prison (served 6)

Arturo "El Negro" Durazo Moreno (19 October 1918 – 5 August 2000) was the Chief of Police in Mexico City for six years, from 1976 to 1982. He was arrested in 1984 and incarcerated on multiple counts of corruption, extortion, tax evasion, smuggling and possession of illegal weapons and cocaine trade kickbacks.

== Biography ==
Durazo was born in the northern border state of Sonora and moved to the capital at a young age. He studied business and worked in the central bank for four years starting in 1944. In 1948, he switched careers to that of traffic inspector, moving on to becoming an agent of the Federal Security Directorate (DFS). At the end of the 1960s, he became a member of the infamous 'White Brigade', a right wing paramilitary police force made up to crush the student movements of 1968 and eradicate the threat of communists and communism in general in Mexico.

In 1976, Durazo's childhood friend, José López Portillo, was nominated as the presidential candidate for the long-ruling Institutional Revolutionary Party (PRI). Durazo became López Portillo's personal security chief, and was rewarded with command of the Mexico City police when Portillo won the election, even though, eleven months earlier, Durazo had been indicted by a U.S. grand jury on narcotics charges. Durazo had a reputation for placing loyalty to his friends above all else. Once in the job, he reported directly to the president, bypassing the Mexico City mayor.

== Chief of police ==
Durazo converted the police into a racketeering empire Although he earned less than $1,000 a month, he acquired two palatial homes, a collection of vintage automobiles and properties in Canada and the U.S. Durazo amassed a fortune in illicit wealth from the bribes paid by every cop in the city, the cocaine trade and kickbacks on the purchase of police equipment.

Durazo was also known for his egomaniacal ways. He asked President Lopez Portillo to make him a five star Army Division General even though Durazo never served in the military. It was granted, and he proudly wore the five star insignia, ignoring the fact that Mexican Division Generals only wear four. When his personal convoy was on the move, roads were blocked to speed his commute.

Mexico's inhabitants were mostly unaware of the methods Durazo's detectives used to keep crime under control until the Tula massacre, in which the bodies of 12 Colombians, alleged to be bank robbers, were found in the Tula River with signs that they had been tortured and executed; questions began to be asked.

== Arrest and death ==
When an order of apprehension was issued for his arrest, Durazo escaped Mexico and reportedly, hid in several countries. Durazo was arrested in Puerto Rico in 1984 by the FBI as he stepped off a private jet. He was held temporarily in the U.S.A. and extradited to Mexico in 1986, where he was tried and incarcerated on multiple counts of corruption, extortion and cocaine trade kickbacks.

Because of his ill health, Durazo was granted a $3M pesos bail in March 1992 and he was released, having completed only 6 years of his 16 year-sentence. Durazo died on August 5, 2000, at the age of 76. His Mexico City palace has been opened as a corruption museum and has become a popular attraction. His palatial house in Zihuatanejo built to resemble the Parthenon has been offered to the Universidad Autónoma de Guerrero by the government.

== See also ==
- List of Mexicans
