= Stroboflash =

Stroboflash II electronic flash on Pacemaker Graphic 45 camera with Graflite battery case. The other Stroboflash models used the same lamp head.

Stroboflash is the name of one of the earliest commercially successful portable dry cell battery powered electronic flashes produced.

== History of development ==
It was designed and initially manufactured in 1942 by Strobo Research, a company founded by Edward Farber and Harold Edgerton that was located in Milwaukee, Wisconsin. Stroboflash electronic flashes were used extensively by newspaper photographers as an alternative to flash bulbs. In 1955, Stroboflash was sold by Strobo Research to Graflex, Inc., a now defunct company that also produced sheet film large format cameras and a host of camera accessories and was located in Rochester, New York. There were four models of Stroboflash, aptly designated as Stroboflash I, Stroboflash II, Stroboflash III and Stroboflash IV. The Stroboflash I used two 240 volt dry cell batteries that are no longer made and was the lightest of the four models and produced 50 watt seconds of light power. The Stroboflash II, III and IV were powered by two 225 volt dry cell batteries that are still produced by Eveready, but are now quite expensive (two #489 225 volt batteries hooked up to produce 450 volts). The Stroboflash II and Stroboflash IV were produced by Graflex through 1975, when Graflex, Inc. sold the Stroboflash IV to another company called Graflite that produced it until about 1978, then they also went out of business. The Stroboflash III was only produced for a few years. It put out 200 watt seconds of light power, but could not be turned down. It was replaced by the Stroboflash IV that had four power setting that could be selected via a rotary top mounted switch: 1/4 (50 watt seconds), 1/2 (100 watt seconds), 3/4 (150 watt seconds) and full (200 watt seconds). The Stroboflash II had a constant 100 watt second light output that was not adjustable.

== Stroboflash Flash features ==
All four Stroboflash models consisted of a power pack that connected to a separate flash head via a power cord and special plug and all used the same Stroboflash flash heads, which were light weight and had a satin reflector that produced very soft, non directional light. Professional photographers used Stroboflash II and IV electronic flashes extensively in the 1950s through 1980s because of the soft, well diffused light they produce. The Stroboflash electronic flash units are still considered flashes that produce excellent quality high power lighting, but the battery expense and the fact that the batteries only produce between 1,000 and 2,000 flashes (depending on the power level selected) and the fact that these flash batteries were not rechargeable led to professionals replacing these flashes with other models that were powered by batteries that could be recharged.

== Current repairs and updates ==
There is a company that has developed a rechargeable power supply for the Stroboflash II, III, and IV, which plugs right into the Stroboflash power pack instead of the original dry cell batteries and uses two 12 volt rechargeable battery packs. They also repair these flashes. This can be found at Stroboflash.com.

== Sources ==
- Graflex.org, particularly: http://graflex.org/graflex-products-list.html
- Stroboflash.com, particularly: http://www.stroboflash.com/Stroboflash/Stroboflash_Main.html
- History of Technology, more particularly: http://www.uwgb.edu/Library/spc/findingAids/technology.pdf
