= Tula massacre =

The Tula massacre was a 1982 massacre near the municipality of Atotonilco de Tula in the Mexican state of Hidalgo, north of Mexico City, where 13 Colombian men were murdered. The incident resulted in a minor political scandal, though no one was ever convicted in relation to the crime.

== Background ==
On 14 January 1982, the bodies of 13 men were found on the borders of a drainage canal in the Tula River. There was a doubt about the sexual identity of one of the victims, who could have been a woman dressed in men's clothing.

The bodies showed signs of torture and mutilation, some of them with their heads in plastic bags. Some were decapitated, while others were slashed with machetes, and most with a shot to the head. The facts of the massacre were denounced by J. Gonzales Gonzales, who accused his boss, Arturo Durazo Moreno, the then Mexico City Police chief, of being the intellectual author of the crime. Durazo was the chief of police in Mexico City during the administration of his friend, President José López Portillo.

The dead, apparently all Colombians, formed a band of criminals who were exploited by Durazo. Durazo allegedly hid them in jail and released them to rob banks repeatedly. It was said that Durazo decided to keep the loot and do away with the Colombians and their Mexican taxi driver, who also disappeared, last seen in June 1981 by his mother. It was said that the group were held in secret jails and the La Castañeda psychiatric hospital, tortured and murdered them, and then dumped them into a sewer in Mexico City. Their decomposed remains were later fished out of the Tula River by a Red Cross diving team.

Durazo was considered to be corrupt, incompetent, and criminal. Portillo, put up with it because they were childhood friends. Durazo fled Mexico in 1982 following the election of a new president and investigations into police corruption. He returned some time later and died in August 2000 in Acapulco, Guerrero.

The pictures of the 13 dead and partial information of the crime was published by ¡Alarma!, an explicit Mexico City publication that deals in images of mutilated and deformed human bodies.
