= V1370 Aquilae =

Nova that occurred in 1982

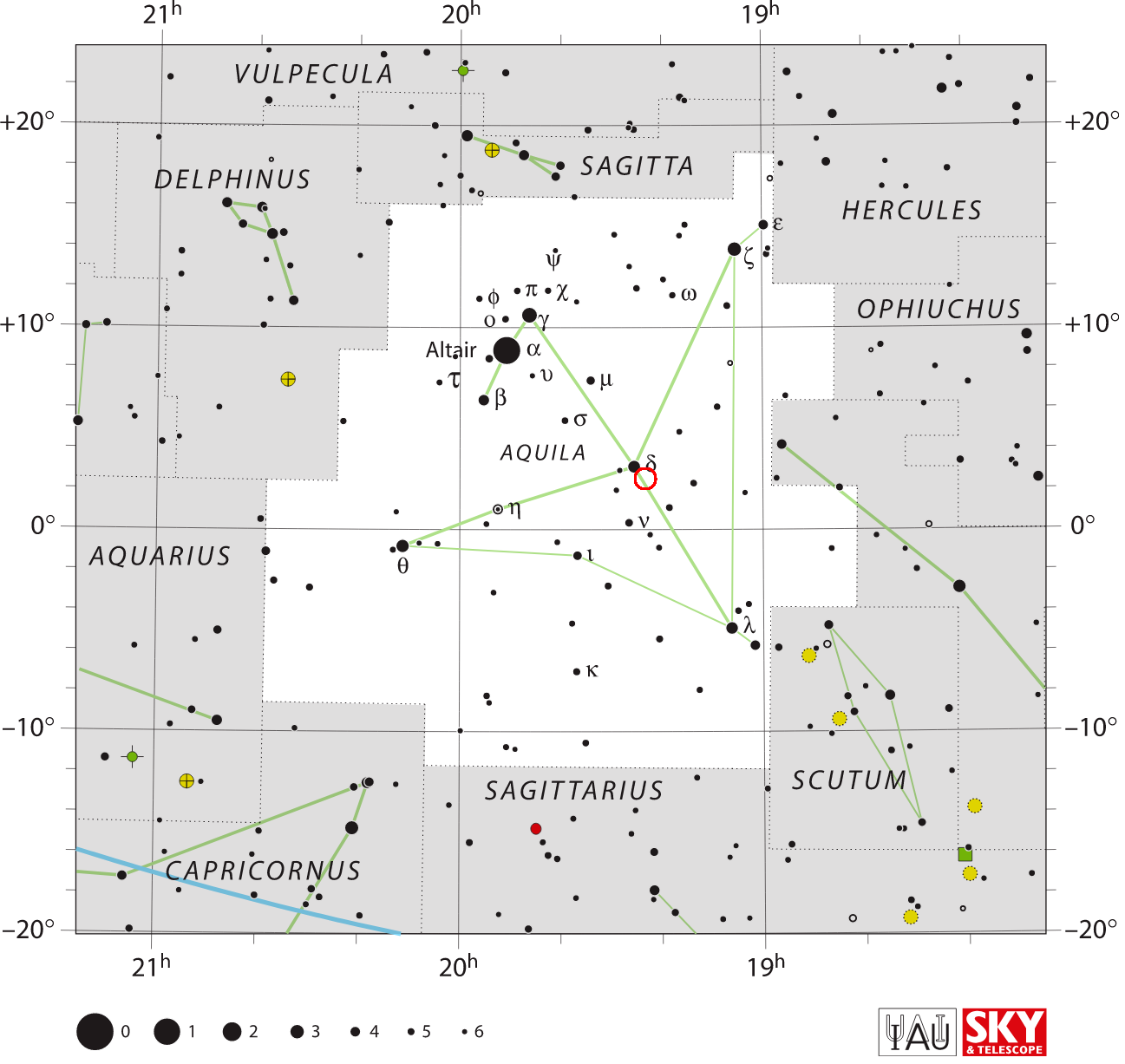
- Location of V1370 Aquilae (circled in red)

Observation data Epoch J2000.0 Equinox ICRS
- Constellation: Aquila
- Right ascension: 19^{h} 23^{m} 21.245^{s}
- Declination: −02° 29′ 26.33″
- Apparent magnitude (V): 6.0 – 20.0

Astrometry
Proper motion (μ)	RA: −3.433 mas/yr Dec.: −8.168 mas/yr
Parallax (π)	0.4387±0.1503 mas
Distance	2928+3198 −450 pc

Characteristics
- Variable type: Nova

Other designations
- V1370 Aql, Gaia DR2 4288898099224201856, 2MASS J19232125+0229262

Database references
SIMBAD	data

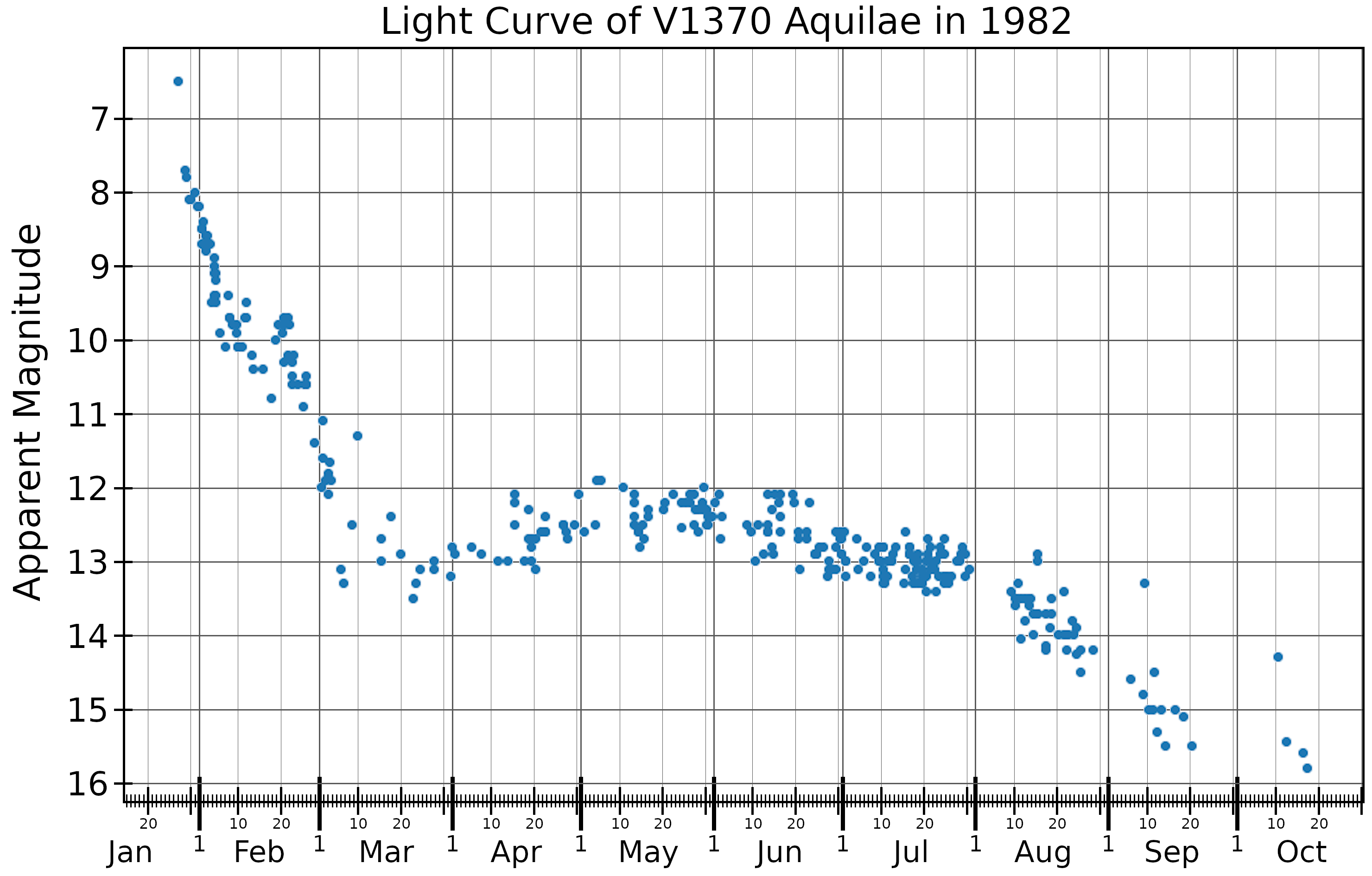
The light curve of V1370 Aquilae, plotted from AAVSO data along with data from Rosino et al. The magnitude on the morning the nova was discovered, estimated as 6–7, is plotted as 6.5.

V1370 Aquilae, also known as Nova Aquilae 1982, is a nova that appeared in the constellation Aquila during 1982. It was discovered by Minoru Honda of Kurashiki, Japan at 20:30 UT on 27 January 1982. At that time the Sun had moved just far enough from Aquila to allow the nova to be seen in the morning sky. Although it was discovered photographically, its apparent magnitude was 6–7, making it potentially visible to the naked eye under ideal conditions. A possible magnitude 20 progenitor was located on the Palomar Sky Survey prints. Spectra of the object were taken in February 1982 at Asiago Astrophysical Observatory, which confirmed that it is a nova.

V1370 Aquilae faded rapidly after its discovery, and it had dimmed by three magnitudes in 13 days, making it a "fast" nova in the classification scheme of Cecilia Payne-Gaposchkin. The light curve passed through a local minimum 43 days after the nova's discovery. That "dust dip", about 1 magnitude deep, resulted in the light curve being classified as type D.

V1370 Aquilae erupted one year before the launch of the IRAS satellite, and it was detected by that satellite in the 12 and 25 micron bands. The fading nova was also observed from the ground in the near and mid infrared by Bode et al., who concluded that either dust formed at an unusually early time in the nova event, or it was already present before the 1982 eruption occurred.

All novae are binary stars, with a "donor" star orbiting a white dwarf. The stars are so close to each other that material is transferred from the donor to the white dwarf. In the case of V1370 Aquilae, Shara et al. estimated, based on the amplitude of the outburst and the rate of fading, that the mass of the white dwarf is 1.13M_{☉}. Their models indicate that the white dwarf is accreting mass from the donor at a rate of 3.1 × 10^{−9} M_{☉} yr^{−1}, and it will erupt as a nova every ~4000 years, after 1.29 × 10^{−5} M_{☉} of material has been accreted. V1370 Aquilae is a "neon nova", a nova with a high mass white dwarf that ejects some of the white dwarf itself, along with the products of the thermonuclear runaway on the surface, during the nova event.
