= Viva Republica =

South Korean fintech company

Viva Republica Inc.
- Native name: 주식회사 비바리퍼블리카
- Type: Private
- Industry: Fintech
- Founded: 2014
- Founder: Lee Seung-gun
- Headquarters: Gangnam District, Seoul, South Korea
- Area served: South Korea, Vietnam
- Key people: Lee Seung-gun (CEO)
- Website: toss.im/en

Viva Republica Inc. (Korean: 주식회사 비바리퍼블리카) is a South Korean technology company active in lending, payment services, financial services and stock brokerage. It is the operator of the financial super-app Toss, which had over 20 million users in South Korea in 2021. With a valuation of $7.4 billion, it was one of the most valuable unicorns in South Korea.

== History ==
Toss was officially launched in February 2015 as a peer-to-peer money transfer platform by former dentist Lee Seung-gun after eight failed ventures. Over time, more and more new services were offered on the platform, including loans, credit scores and personal investing.

Altos Ventures was the first investor in 2014. Later PayPal, Sequoia China and the Singaporean sovereign wealth fund GIC also invested in the start-up.

In 2018, the company became a unicorn after raising $80 million in a funding round led by Kleiner Perkins and Ribbit Capital.

In 2020, Toss was launched in Vietnam, its first overseas expansion.

In June 2021, Viva Republica raised a further $410 million in a funding. Investors included Alkeon Capital and the Korea Development Bank.

In October 2021, Toss launched Toss Bank as South Korea's third digital bank.

In November 2021, Viva Republica announced the acquisition of a majority stake in VCNC, which operates a ride-hailing service called Tada.
