= Lluís Nonell =

Spanish actor

- Born: Lluís Nonell i Brunés; 24 December 1926; Sant Andreu, Barcelona
- Died: 30 January 1982 (aged 55); Teatro Princesa, Valencia
- Occupation: Actor

Lluís Nonell (24 December 1926 – 30 January 1982) was a Spanish actor. He died during the play El diluvio que viene at Teatro Princesa on 30 January 1982 from a sudden cardiac death.

He played Guerau in El Misantrop in 1951, Verbagàlia in an unknown date, La bonna persona de Sezuan in 1965 and in 1966 Mª Els Pastorets at Teatre Romea in Barcelona.

He is the uncle of the dramaturg Ricard Reguant.

== Filmography ==
=== Films ===
- En busca del polvo perdido (1982) as Hombre mayor en tienda de ropa
- El mundo sexual de la pareja (1982) as Entrevistado
- ¡En qué lío me han metido! (1980) as Jefe de Simón
- El jovencito Drácula (1976) as Rudy
- La ciutat cremada (1976)
- Aborto criminal (1973) as Hombre en comisaria
- Fabulous Trinity (1972) as Sheriff John
- Twenty Paces to Death (1970) as Sheriff
- El abogado, el alcalde y el notario (1969) as Constructor
- Chico, chica, ¡boom! (1969) as Taxista
- De Picos Pardos a la ciudad (1969) as Ángel
- La viudita ye-yé (1968) as Taxista
- La 'mini' tía (1968) as Mr. Brown
- Brillante porvenir (1965) as Sr. Bertrán
- El mujeriego (1964) as Amigo

=== TV series ===
- Amor meu (1981)
- Gran teatre (1981)
- Dr. Caparrós, medicina general (1979) as Director de l'hotel
- Teatro catalán (1965-1973) as Robert / El baster / El coronel Don Enric / ...
- Ficciones (1972)
- Percy Stuart (1969-1972) as Mr. Clementino
- Novela (1964)
