= Supergrass (informant) =

Slang term for an informer

Supergrass is a British slang term for an informant who turns King's evidence, often in return for protection and immunity from prosecution. In the British criminal world, police informants have been called "grasses" since the late 1930s, and the "super" prefix was coined by journalists in the early 1970s to describe those who gave evidence against fellow criminals in a series of high-profile mass trials at the time.

== Etymology ==
The term "grass" in this context is used in Arthur Gardner's crime novel Tinker's Kitchen, published in 1932, in which a "grass" is defined as "an informer". The etymology of "grass" being used as signifying a traitor, a person who informs on people he or she knows intimately, ostensibly can be traced to the expression "snake in the grass", which has a similar meaning. The phrase derives from the writings of Virgil (in Latin, latet anguis in herba) and has been known in the English language, meaning "traitor", since the late 17th century.

An alternative claim is made for the term originating from rhyming slang, whereby "grasshopper" is defined as "copper", meaning "policeman". The rhyming slang version was supported in 1950 by lexicographer Paul Tempest, who wrote

Grasser. One who gives information. A "squealer" or "squeaker". The origin derives from rhyming slang: grasshopper – copper; a "grass" or "grasser" tells the "copper" or policeman.

== Usage in Northern Ireland ==
In Northern Ireland, the term "supergrass" especially refers to arrested paramilitaries who divulged the identities of their compatriots to the Royal Ulster Constabulary, possibly in exchange for immunity from prosecution. Sir John Hermon, former Chief Constable of the Royal Ulster Constabulary, did not deny reports that inducements were paid but denied figures as high as £50,000 were involved. The use of the term in Northern Ireland began with the arrest of Christopher Black in 1981. After securing assurances that he would have protection from prosecution, Black gave statements which led to 38 arrests. On 5 August 1983, 22 members of the Provisional IRA were sentenced to a total of more than 4,000 cumulative years in prison, based on Black's testimony alone (eighteen of these convictions were overturned on appeal on 17 July 1986).

By the end of 1982, 25 more "supergrasses" had surfaced contributing to the arrests of over six hundred people from paramilitary organizations, such as the Provisional IRA, the Irish National Liberation Army (INLA) and the Ulster Volunteer Force. On 11 April 1983, members of the loyalist Ulster Volunteer Force were jailed on the evidence of supergrass Joseph Bennett. These convictions were all overturned on 24 December 1984. In October 1983, seven people were convicted on the evidence provided by supergrass Kevin McGrady although the trial judge Lord Chief Justice Robert Lowry had described McGrady's evidence as "bizarre, incredible and contradictory". The last supergrass trial finished on 18 December 1985, when 25 members of the INLA were jailed on the evidence of Harry Kirkpatrick. Twenty-four of these convictions were later overturned on 23 December 1986.

Many convictions based on supergrass testimony were later overturned, and the supergrass system was discontinued in 1985 until reintroduction in 2011. The first supergrass trial in 26 years began on 8 September 2011 for the murder of Ulster Defence Association (UDA) member Tommy English. In Northern Ireland the term "tout" is a popular alternative to "grass". The Police Service of Northern Ireland have refused to use this term and prefer the term assisting offender, based on the legislation that enables the use of such evidence.

== Other usages ==
The term has also been used by The Royal Gazette, a daily newspaper in Bermuda, a British overseas territory. An article in the paper used the term to describe a Transport Control Department worker convicted of selling driver's licenses to Portuguese applicants lacking the necessary English skills to pass the multiple choice exam. The worker was granted a conditional discharge in exchange for information on other Transport Control Department employees abusing the public trust.

One of the most prolific supergrasses in recent British history was Michael Michael whose evidence in 2001 led to 32 criminals being convicted, including his own mother, and the disruption of a £132 million drug ring.

The term was used to describe Girolamo Bruzzese after his brother Marcello was assassinated by the 'Ndrangheta on Christmas Day 2018 in revenge for Girolamo's serving as a witness in court against the 'Ndrangheta.

== See also ==
- Informant
- Pentito
- Supergrass, an English alternative rock band
- The Supergrass, a 1985 English comedy film

== Sources ==
- Supergrasses: The Use of Accomplice Evidence in Northern Ireland; Tony Gifford ISBN 0-900137-21-5
- The Crowned Harp: Policing Northern Ireland — by Graham Ellison and Jim Smyth (2000)
- Supergrass tells of terror fight — BBC News article
- Kevin Morrison Liverpool
- Kevin Morrison Police informant jailed for life Liverpool
