= Births in 1982 =

== January ==
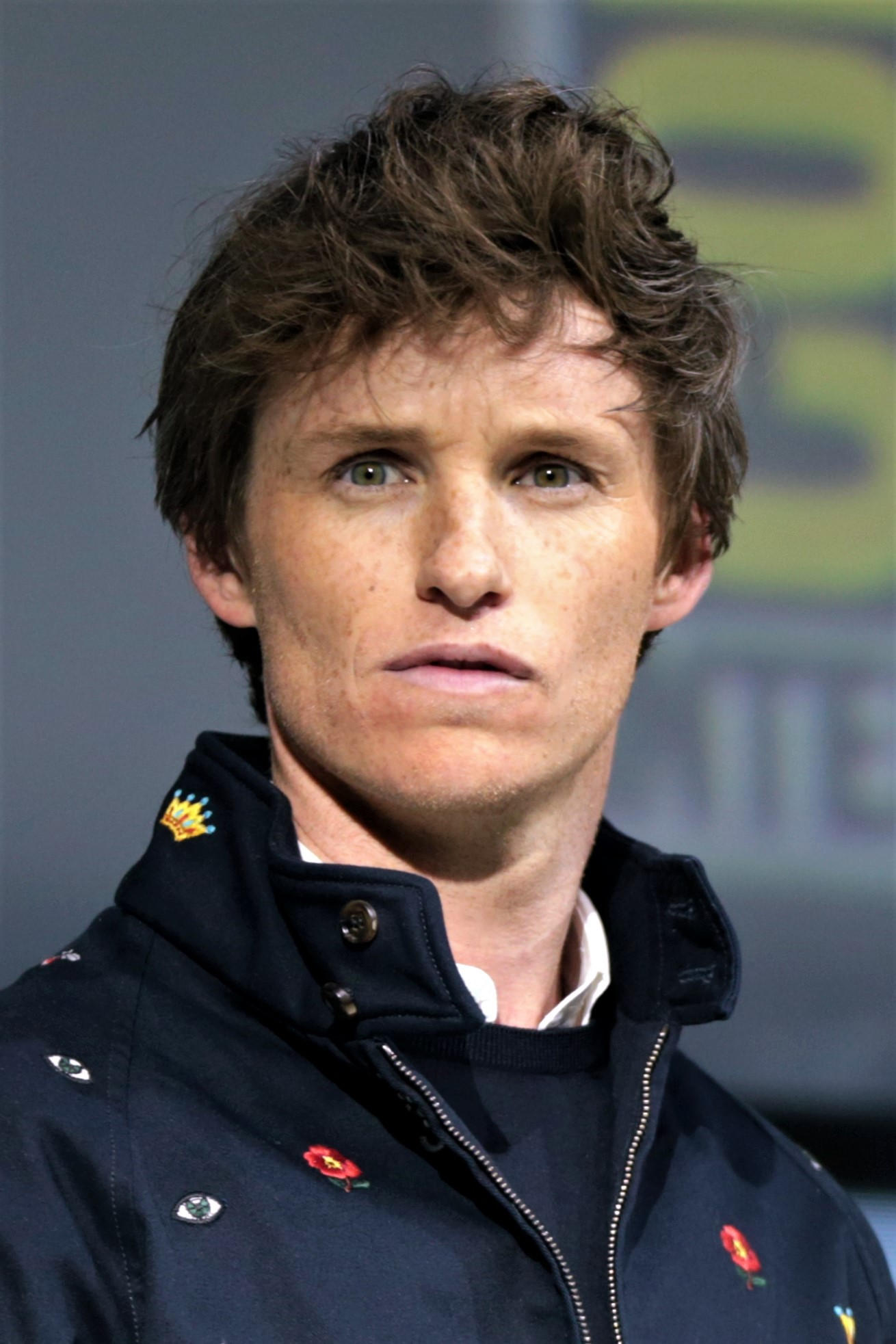
Eddie Redmayne

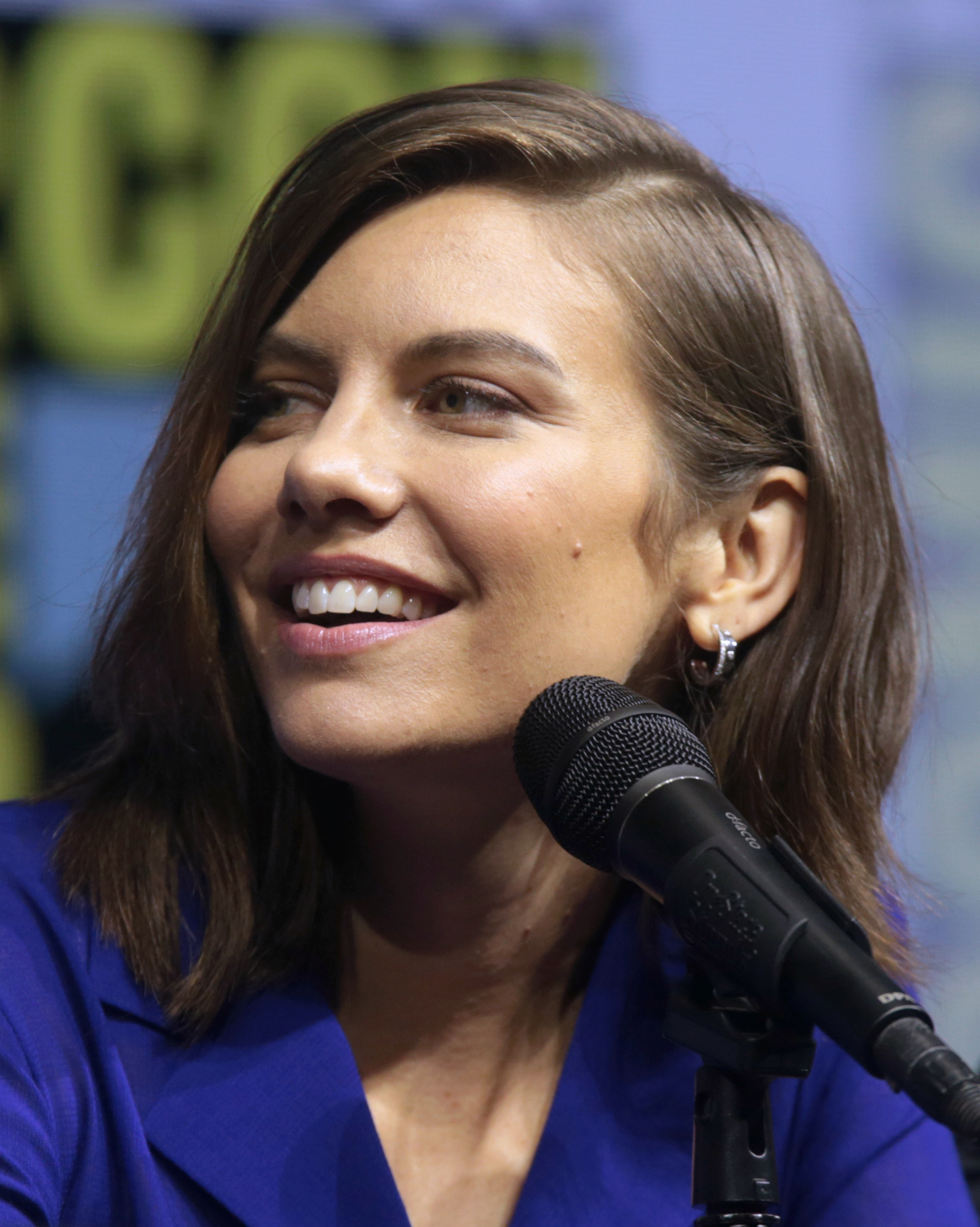
Lauren Cohan

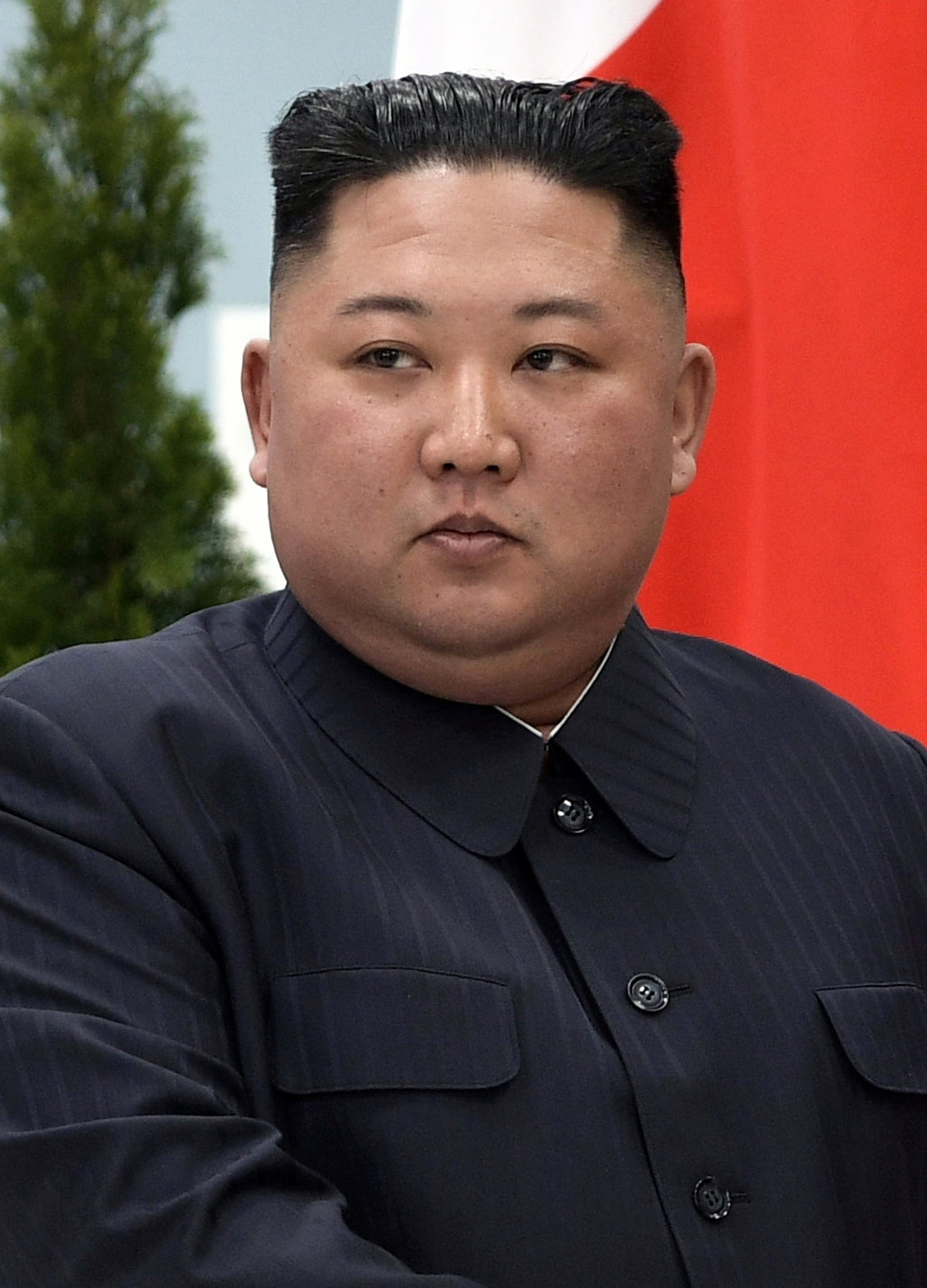
Kim Jong-un

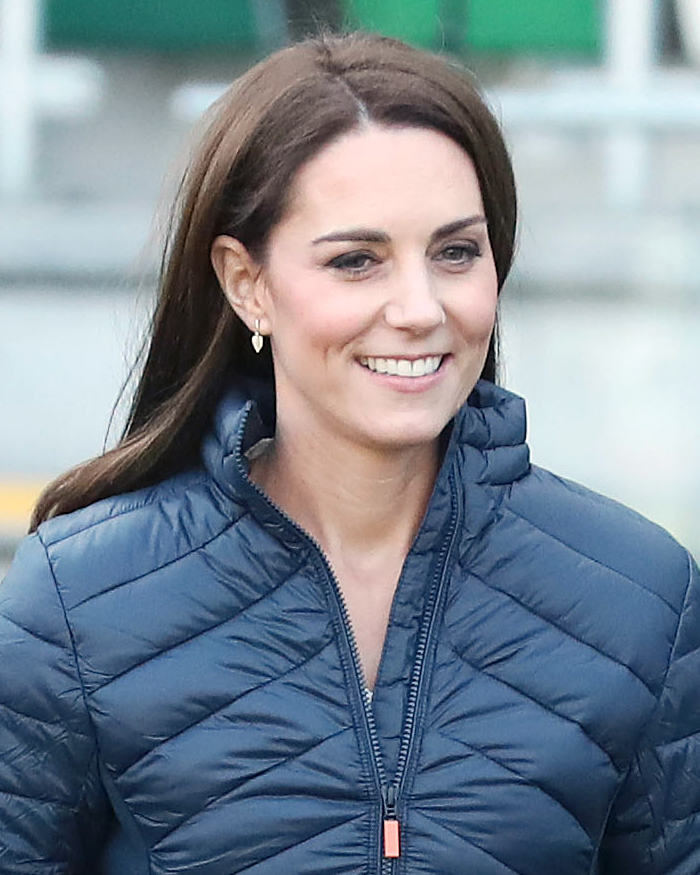
Catherine, Princess of Wales

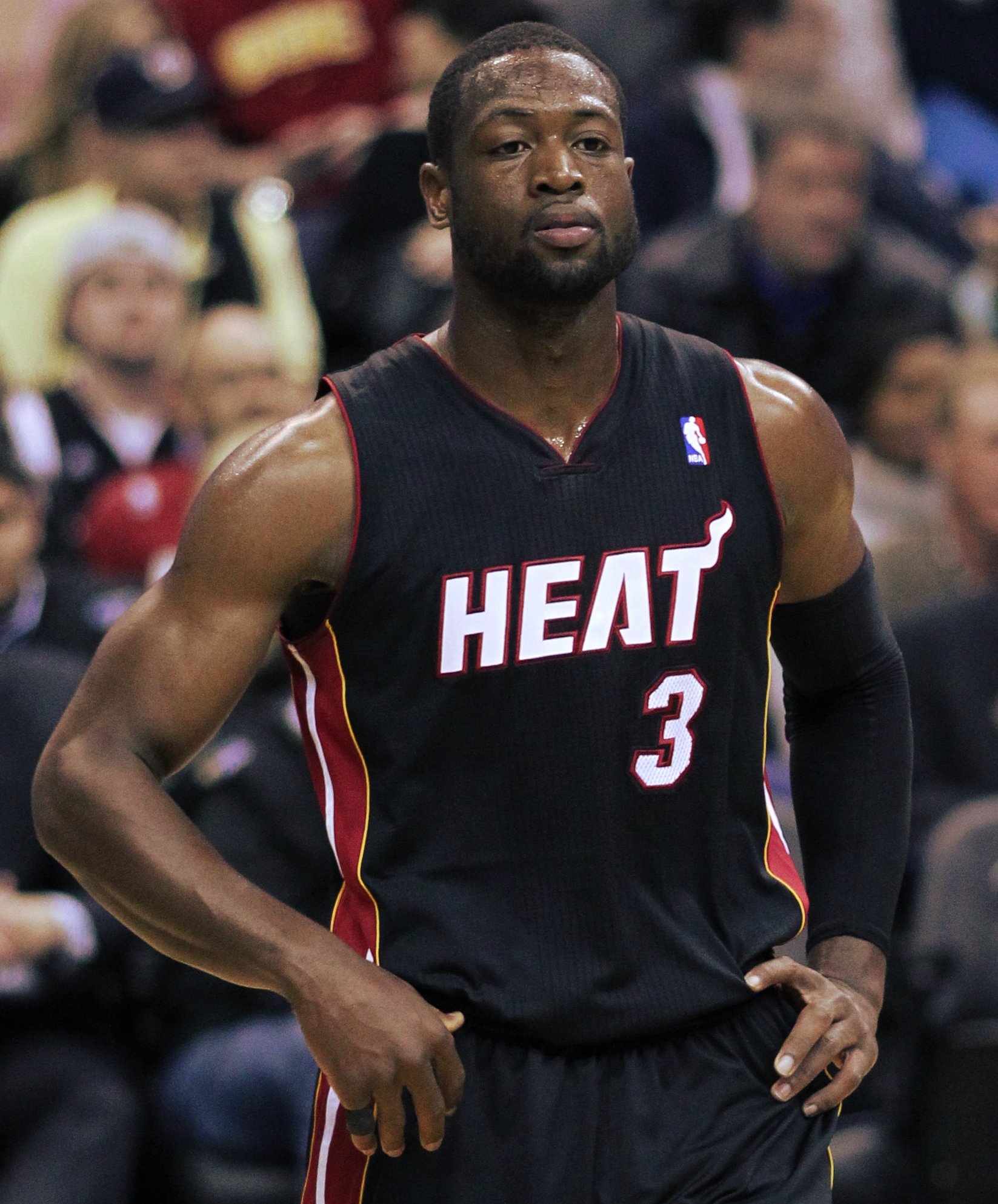
Dwyane Wade

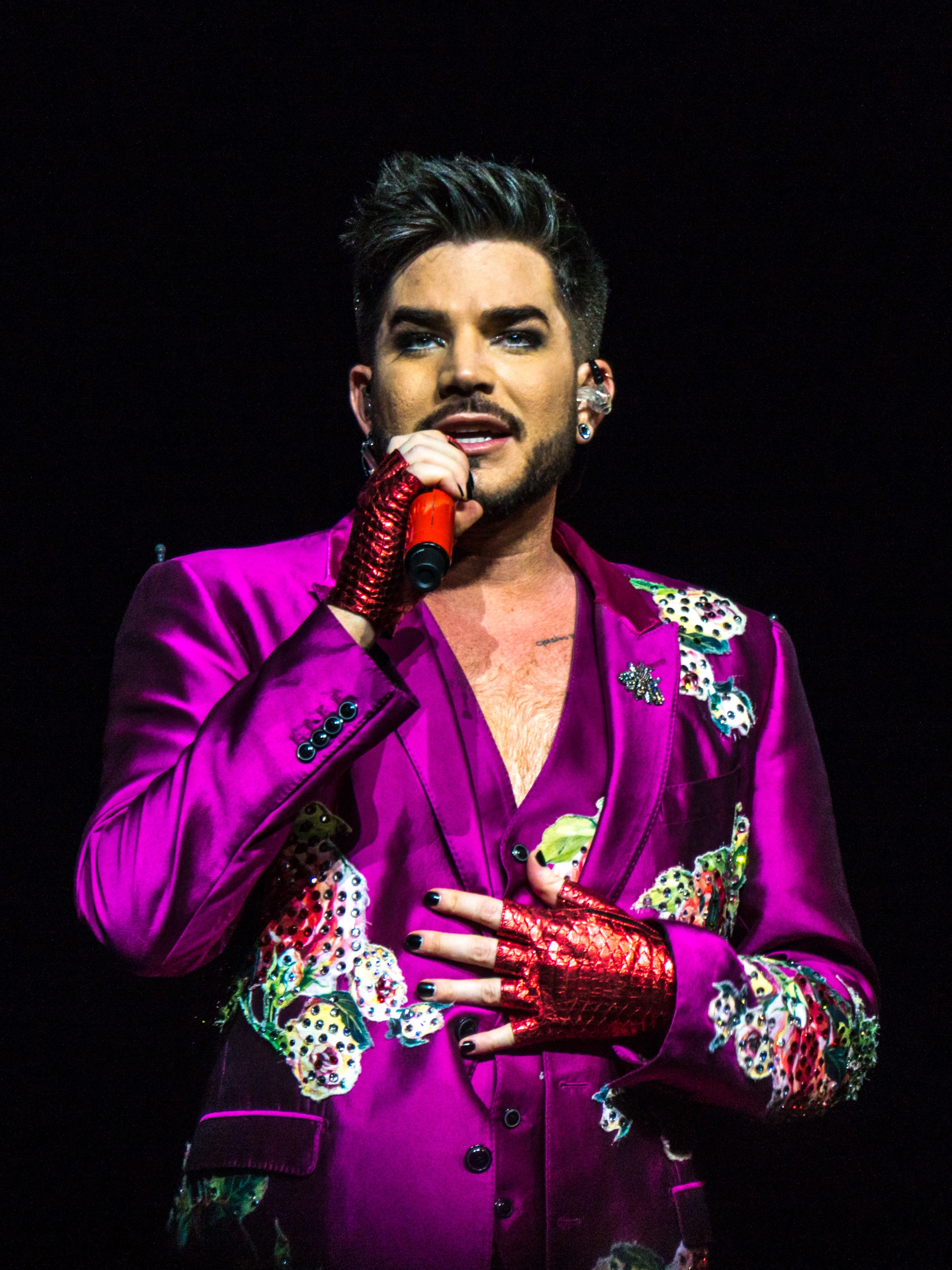
Adam Lambert

- January 1 – David Nalbandian, Argentine tennis player
- January 4 – Kang Hye-jung, South Korean actress
- January 5
  - Janica Kostelić, Croatian skier
  - Vadims Vasiļevskis, Latvian javelin thrower
- January 6
  - Gilbert Arenas, American basketball player
  - Eddie Redmayne, English actor
- January 7
  - Lauren Cohan, American actress
  - Ruth Negga, Irish actress
  - Hannah Stockbauer, German swimmer
  - Camilo Villegas, Colombian golfer
- January 8 - Kim Jong Un, Supreme Leader Of North Korea.
- January 9 – Catherine, Princess of Wales, British princess
- January 13
  - Guillermo Coria, Argentine tennis player
  - Ruth Wilson, English actress
- January 14 – Víctor Valdés, Spanish football player
- January 15
  - Benjamin Agosto, American skater
  - Emina Jahović, Serbian born-Turkish singer and actress
- January 17 – Dwyane Wade, American professional basketball player
- January 18
  - Marco Borriello, Italian footballer
  - Joanna Newsom, American singer, harpist, pianist and songwriter
- January 19 – Pete Buttigieg, American politician and Presidential candidate (Mayor of South Bend, Indiana)
- January 20 – Pierre Webó, Cameroonian football player and coach
- January 21
  - Nicolas Mahut, French tennis player
  - Simon Rolfes, German footballer
- January 22
  - Sedef Avcı, Turkish actress and model
  - Fabricio Coloccini, Argentine footballer
  - Paula Pequeno, Brazilian volleyball player
- January 23 – Alexandru Jicul, Moldovan professional football player
- January 25 – Noemi, Italian singer
- January 28
  - Camila Alves, Brazilian model and designer
  - Mirtel Pohla, Estonian actress
  - Ainett Stephens, Venezuelan television personality/model
- January 29
  - Adam Lambert, American singer
  - Ernest Prakasa, Indonesian Comedian
- January 31 – Elena Paparizou, Greek-Swedish singer

== February ==
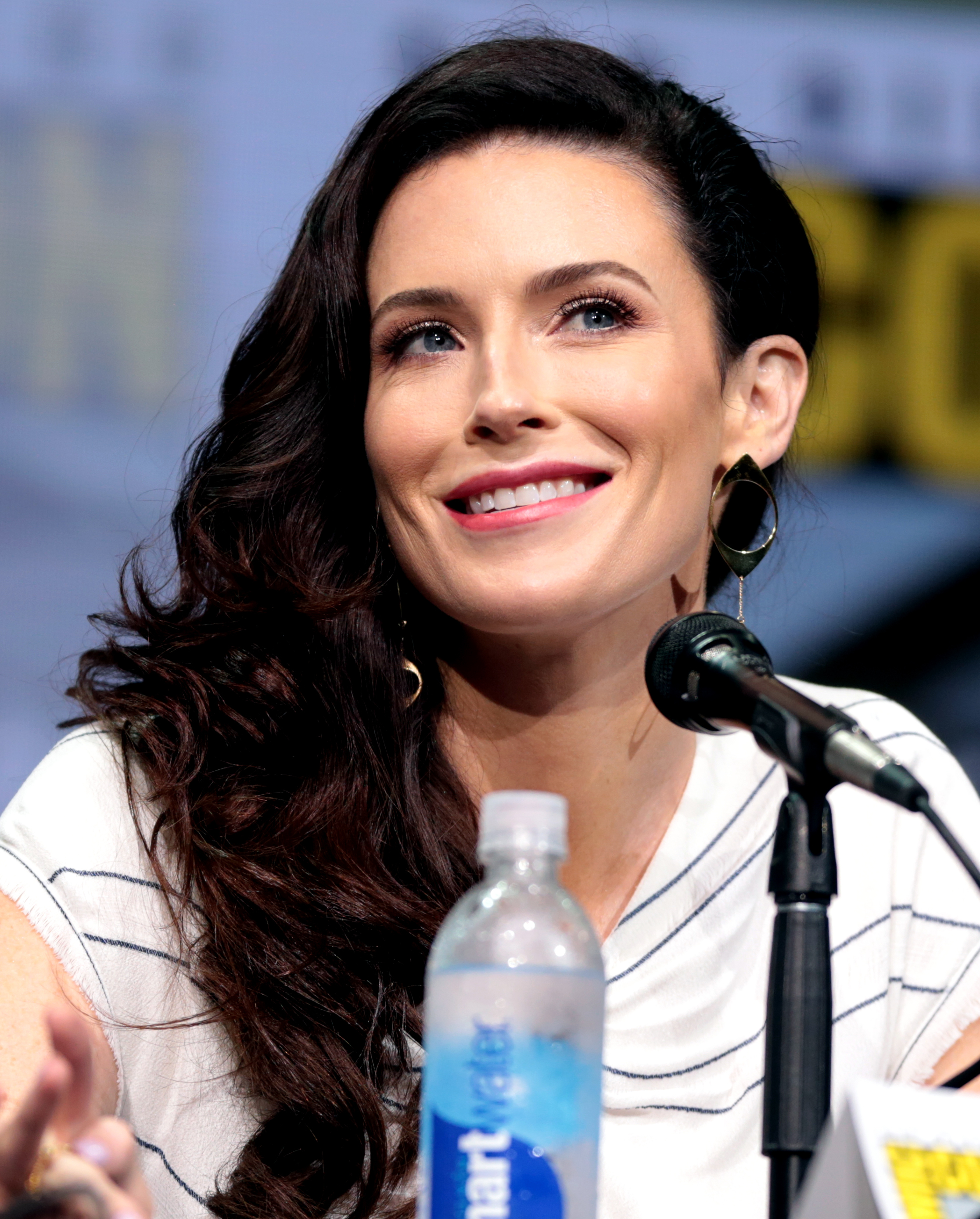
Bridget Regan

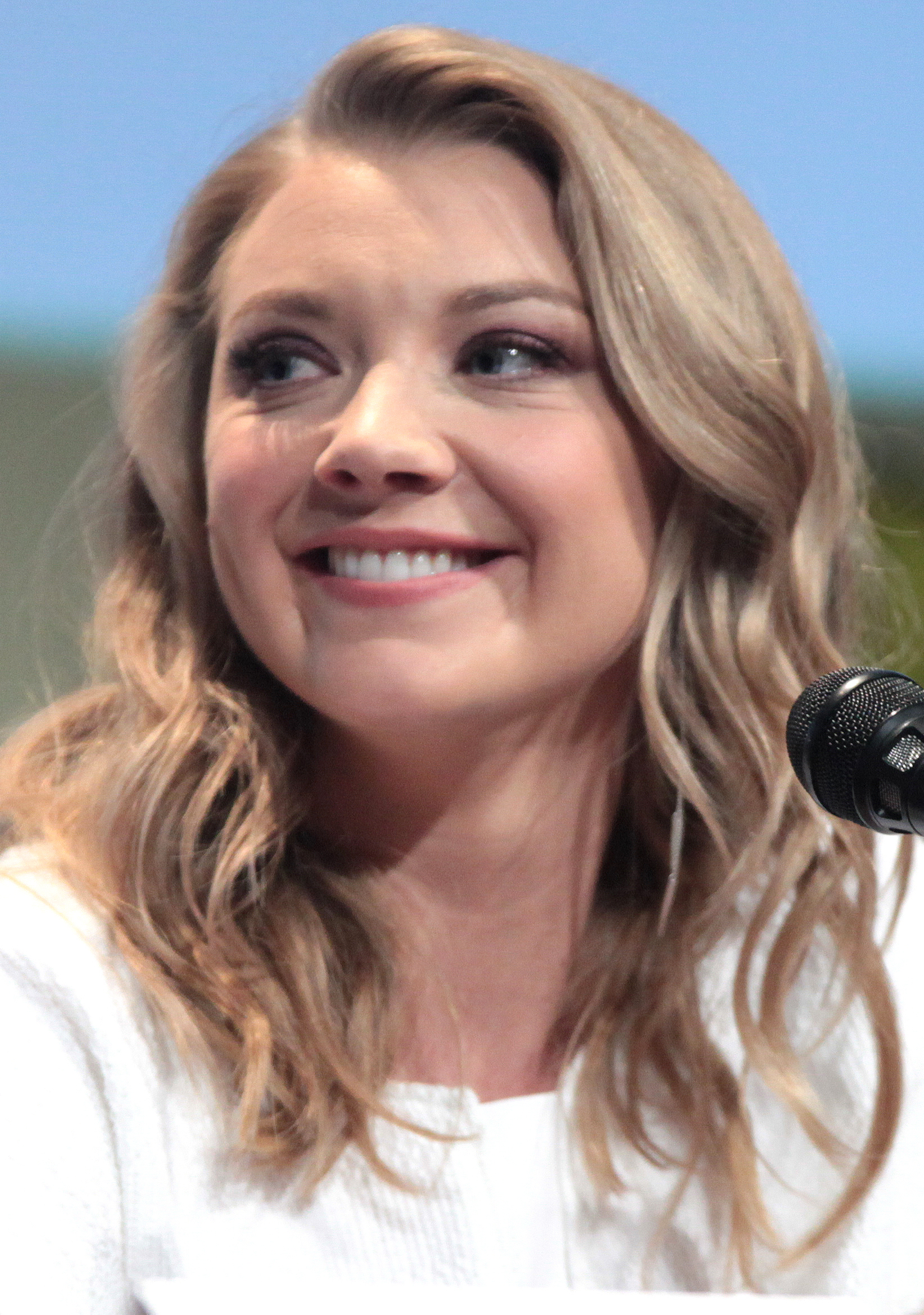
Natalie Dormer

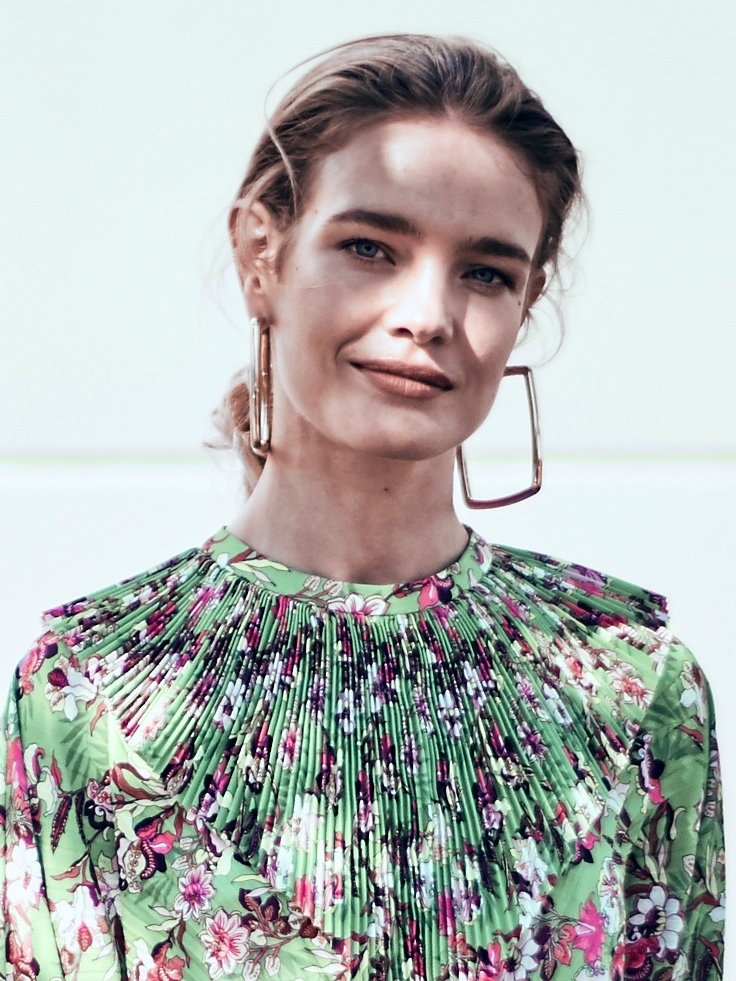
Natalia Vodianova

- February 1 – Gavin Henson, Welsh rugby union player
- February 2
  - Katie Britt, American politician
  - Filippo Magnini, Italian swimmer
- February 3
  - Diego Acoglanis, Argentine footballer
  - Vera Brezhneva, Ukrainian and Russian pop-singer and television presenter
  - Bridget Regan, American actress
- February 4 – Tomas Vaitkus, Lithuanian professional road racing cyclist
- February 5
  - Rodrigo Palacio, Argentine footballer
  - Jenn Suhr, American pole vaulter
- February 6 – Alice Eve, English actress
- February 7 – Nicola Spirig, Swiss triathlete
- February 8 – Zersenay Tadese, Eritrean long-distance track/road running athlete
- February 10
  - Ayari Aoyama, Japanese swimmer
  - Justin Gatlin, American athlete
  - Mon Redee Sut Txi, Malaysian athlete
- February 11
  - Natalie Dormer, English actress
  - Neil Robertson, Australian snooker player
- February 12 – Carter Hayden, Canadian actor
- February 14 – Marián Gáborík, Czechoslovak (now Slovak) hockey player
- February 16 – Lupe Fiasco, American rapper
- February 17
  - Adriano, Brazilian footballer
  - Brooke D'Orsay, Canadian actress
- February 19 – Camelia Potec, Romanian swimmer
- February 25
  - Chris Baird, Northern Irish footballer
  - Maria Kanellis, American professional wrestler/model
  - Bert McCracken, American singer (The Used)
  - Flavia Pennetta, Italian tennis player
- February 26 – Li Na, Chinese tennis player
- February 27 – Bruno Soares, Brazilian tennis player
- February 28
  - Verena Bentele, German Paralympic biathlete
  - Natalia Vodianova, Russian model, actress and philanthropist

== March ==
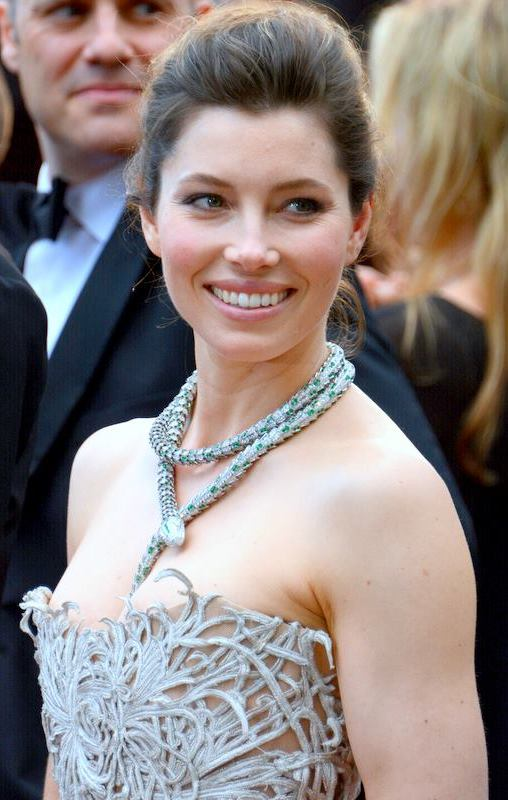
Jessica Biel

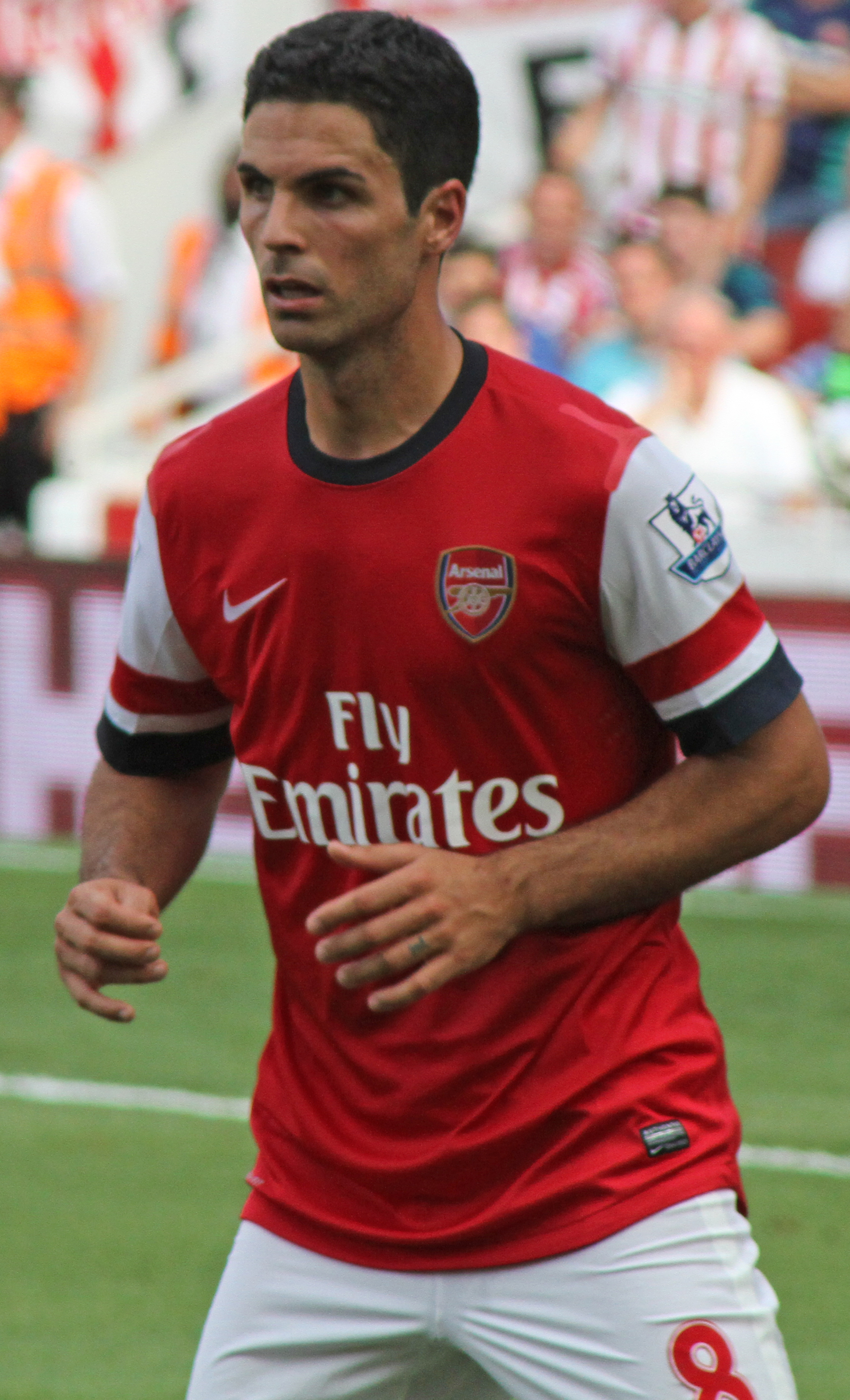
Mikel Arteta

- March 2
  - Pilou Asbæk, Danish actor
  - Kevin Kurányi, German soccer player
  - Henrik Lundqvist, Swedish ice hockey player
- March 3 – Jessica Biel, American actress
- March 4
  - Landon Donovan, American soccer player
  - Hanna Hopko, Ukrainian politician
- March 5 – Daniel Carter, New Zealand rugby player
- March 6 – Stephen Jordan, English footballer
- March 8
  - David Lee, American volleyball player
  - Kat Von D, American-Mexican tattoo artist
- March 9
  - Matt Bowen, Australian rugby league player
  - Mirjana Lučić-Baroni, Croatian tennis player
- March 10 – Thomas Middleditch, Canadian actor and screenwriter
- March 11
  - Thora Birch, American actress and producer
  - Mircea Monroe, American actress and model
- March 13
  - Lina Länsberg, Swedish mixed martial artist, Kickboxer and Muai thai fighter
  - Gisela Mota Ocampo, mayor of Temixco, Morelos, Mexico (d. 2016)
- March 15
  - Wilson Kipsang Kiprotich, Kenyan long-distance runner
  - Daniel Richardsson, Swedish Olympic cross-country skier
- March 17 – Steven Pienaar, South African footballer
- March 18 – Paola Cardullo, Italian volleyball player
- March 20 – Robbie Lawler, American mixed martial artist
- March 23
  - Tomasz Kuszczak, Polish football goalkeeper
  - Adam Thomson, New Zealand rugby player
- March 25
  - Danica Patrick, American race car driver
  - Jenny Slate, American actress and comedian
- March 26 – Mikel Arteta, Spanish footballer and manager
- March 30
  - Philippe Mexès, French footballer
  - Javier Portillo, Spanish footballer
- March 31
  - Tal Ben Haim, Israeli footballer
  - Chloé Zhao, Chinese-American film director
  - Brian Tyree Henry, American actor

== April ==
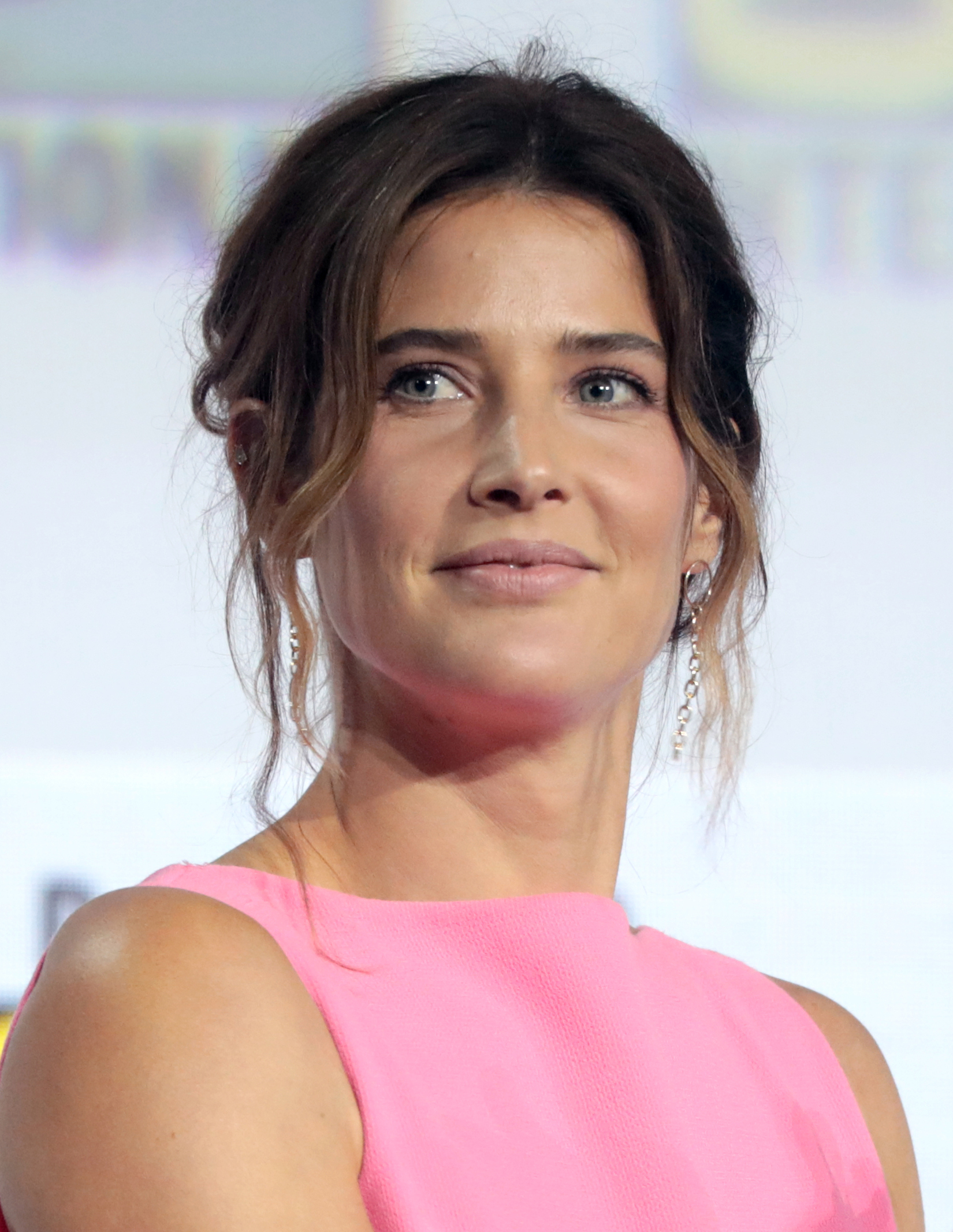
Cobie Smulders

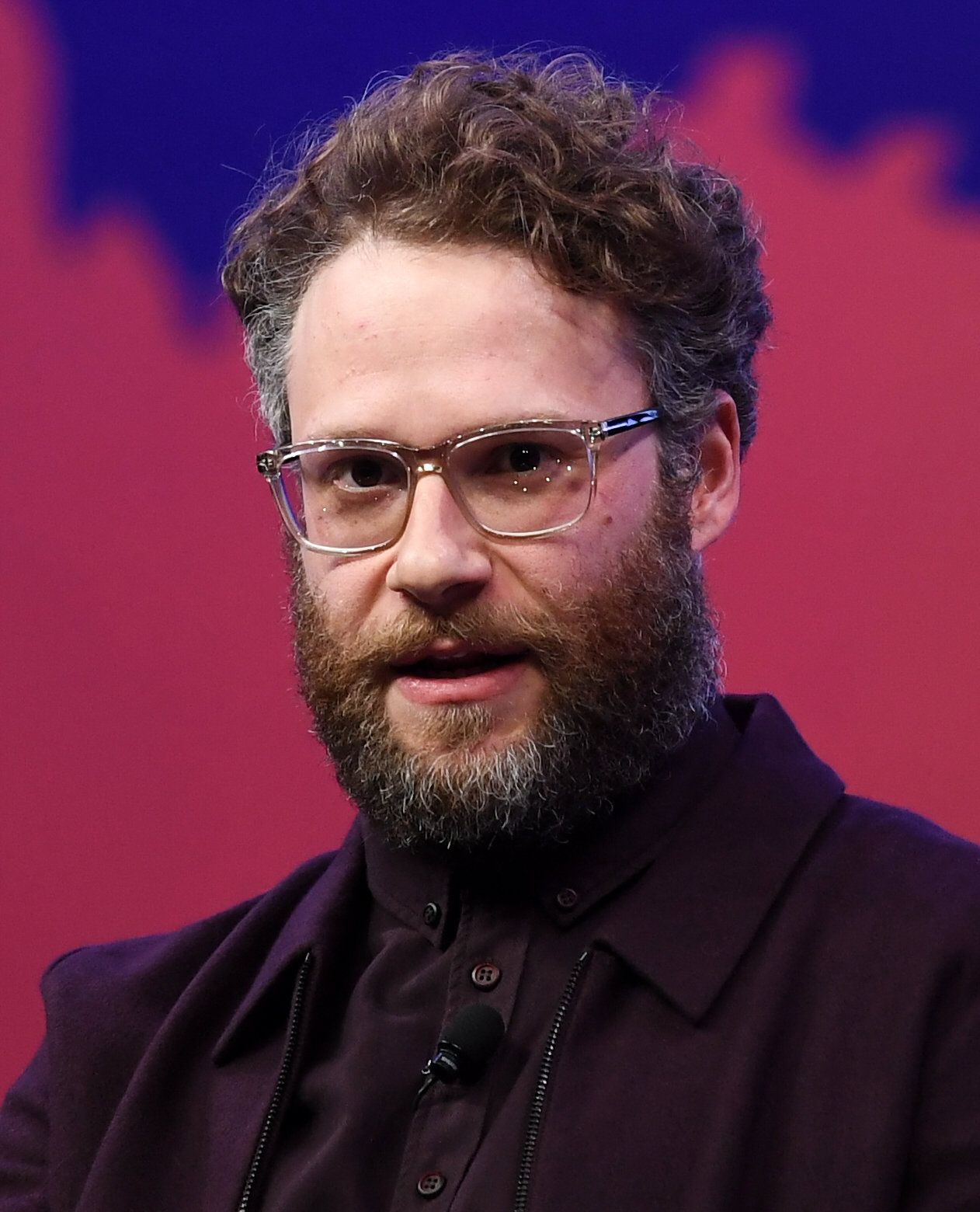
Seth Rogen

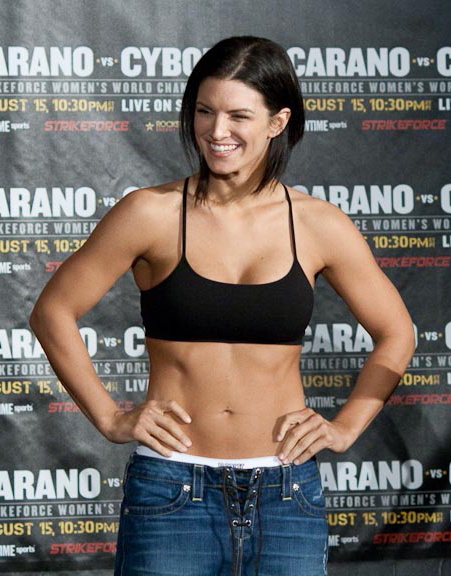
Gina Carano

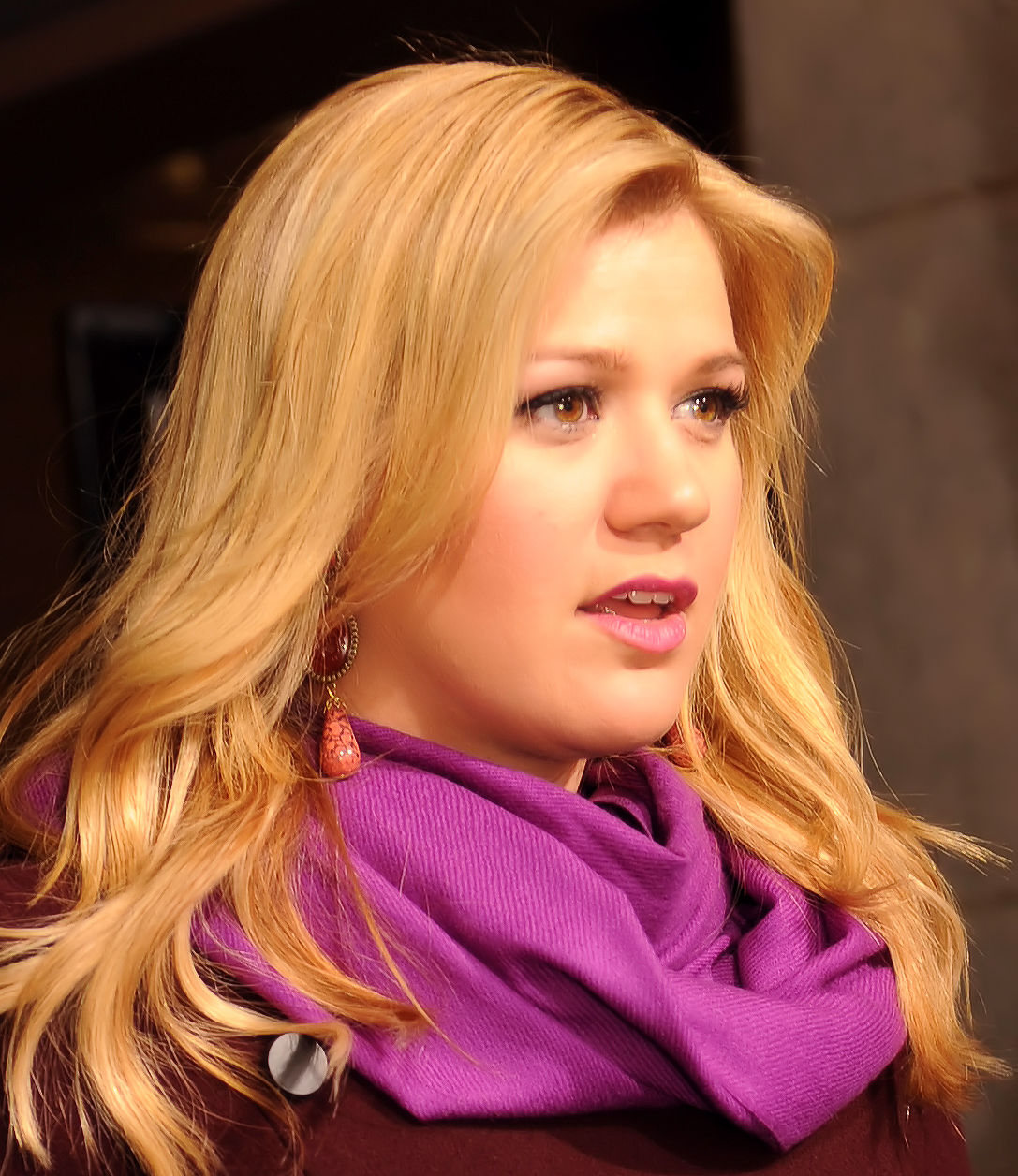
Kelly Clarkson

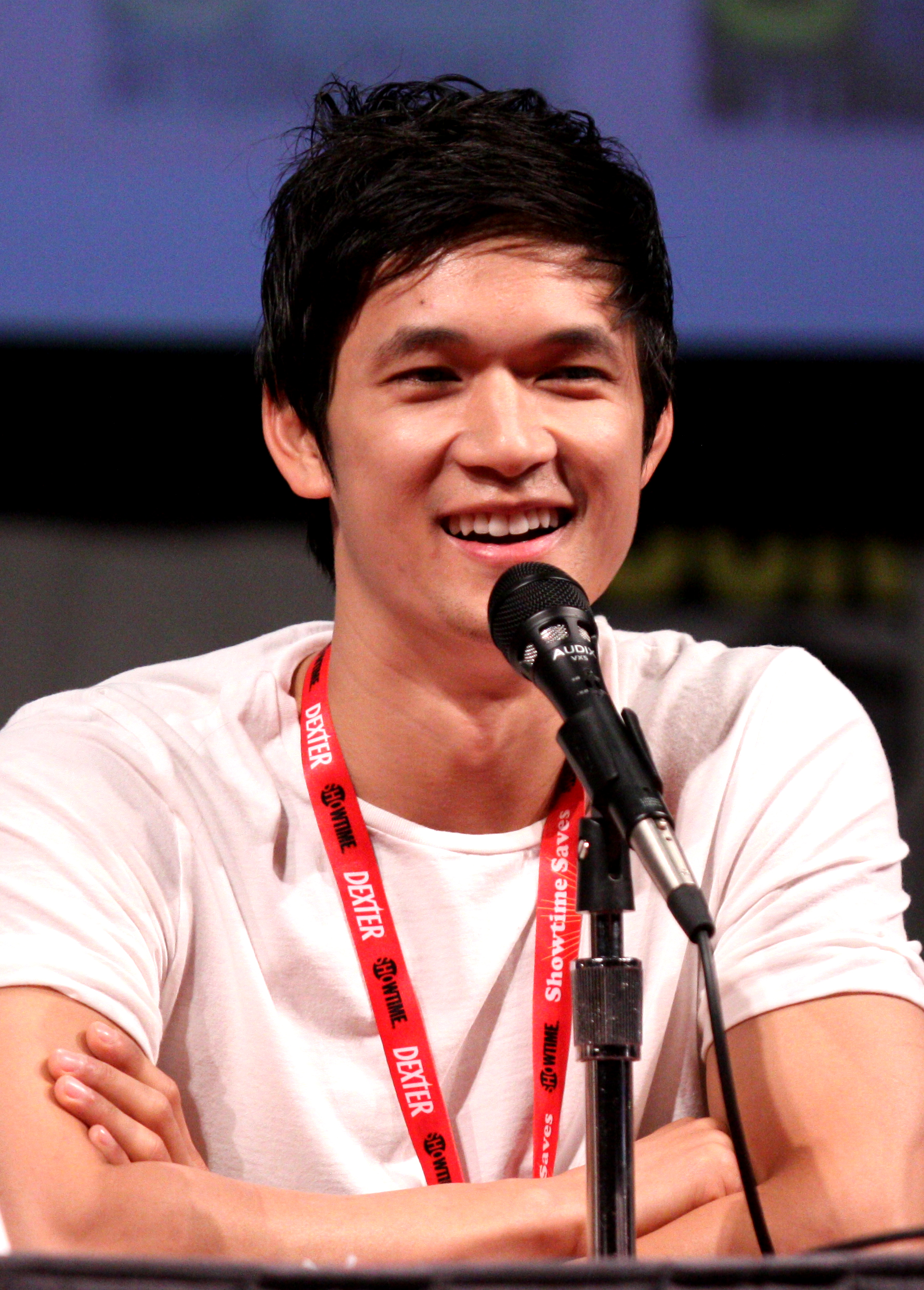
Harry Shum Jr.

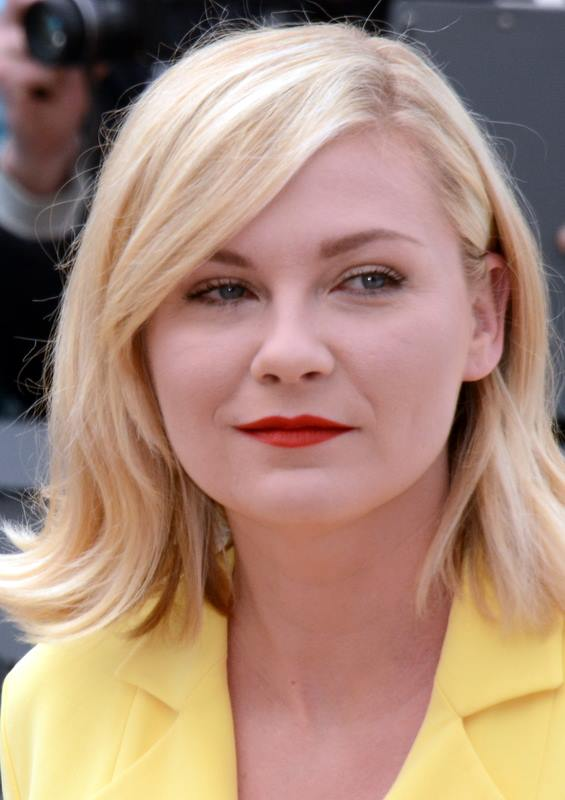
Kirsten Dunst

- April 1
  - Andreas Thorkildsen, Norwegian javelin thrower
  - Róbert Vittek, Slovak football player
- April 2 – David Ferrer, Spanish tennis player
- April 3 – Cobie Smulders, Canadian actress
- April 5
  - Thomas Hitzlsperger, German director of football and former footballer
  - Hayley Atwell, British-American actress
- April 9
  - Jay Baruchel, Canadian actor and film director
  - Olímpio Cipriano, Angolan basketball player
  - RedOne, Moroccan musician and producer
- April 10 – Chyler Leigh, American actress
- April 12 – Anna Sivkova, Russian fencer
- April 13 – Federico Crescentini, Sanmarinese football player (d. 2006)
- April 14 – Larissa França, Brazilian beach volleyball player
- April 15 – Seth Rogen, Canadian actor, comedian, film director and screenwriter
- April 16 – Gina Carano, American actress, television personality, fitness model and mixed martial artist
- April 17 – Tyron Woodley, American mixed martial artist
- April 18
  - Donna Feldman, American model and actress
  - Scott Hartnell, Canadian hockey player
- April 19 – Ola Vigen Hattestad, Norwegian Olympic cross-country skier
- April 20 – Keiichiro Nagashima, Japanese speed skater
- April 22 – Kaká, Brazilian footballer
- April 23 – Kyle Beckerman, American footballer
- April 24 – Kelly Clarkson, American singer
- April 25 – Monty Panesar, English cricketer
- April 26 – Novlene Williams-Mills, Jamaica sprinter
- April 27 – Brian Gallant, Canadian politician, Premier of New Brunswick
- April 28 – Harry Shum Jr., Costa Rican-American dancer and actor
- April 30
  - Lloyd Banks, American rapper
  - Kirsten Dunst, American actress
  - Drew Seeley, Canadian actor, singer-songwriter and dancer

== May ==
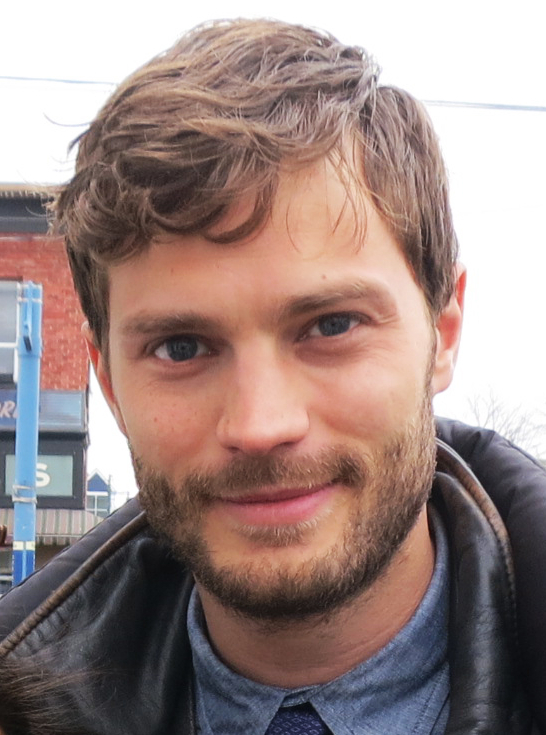
Jamie Dornan

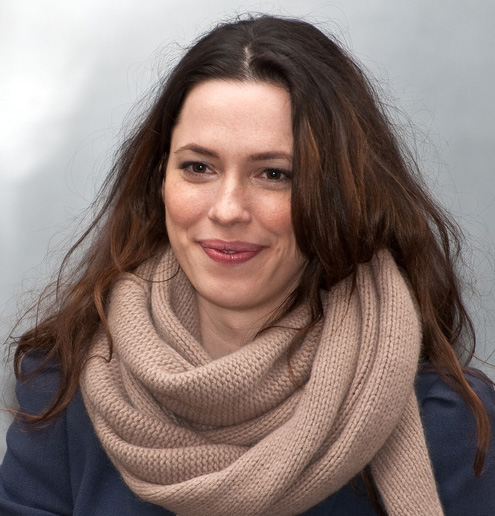
Rebecca Hall

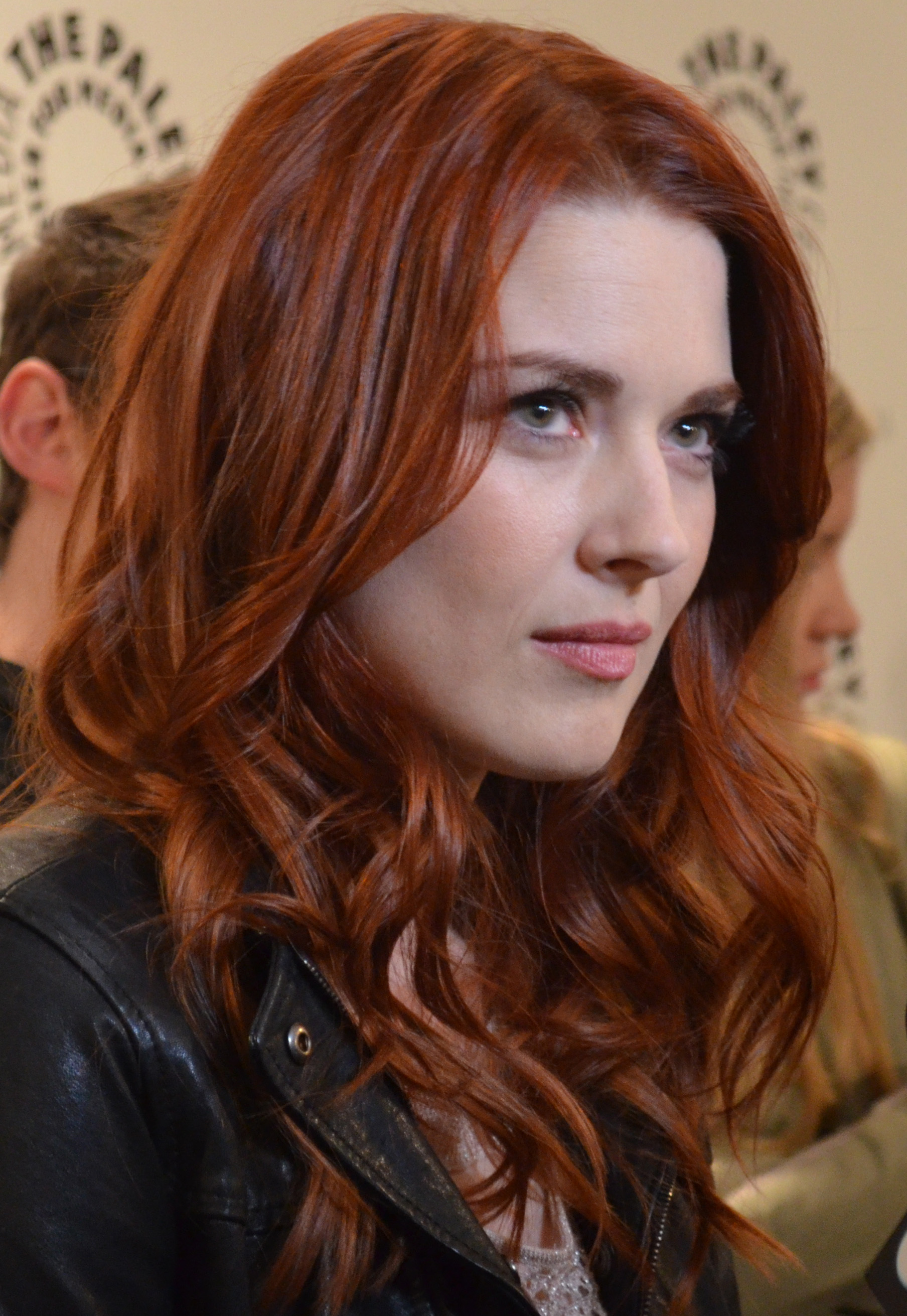
Alexandra Breckenridge

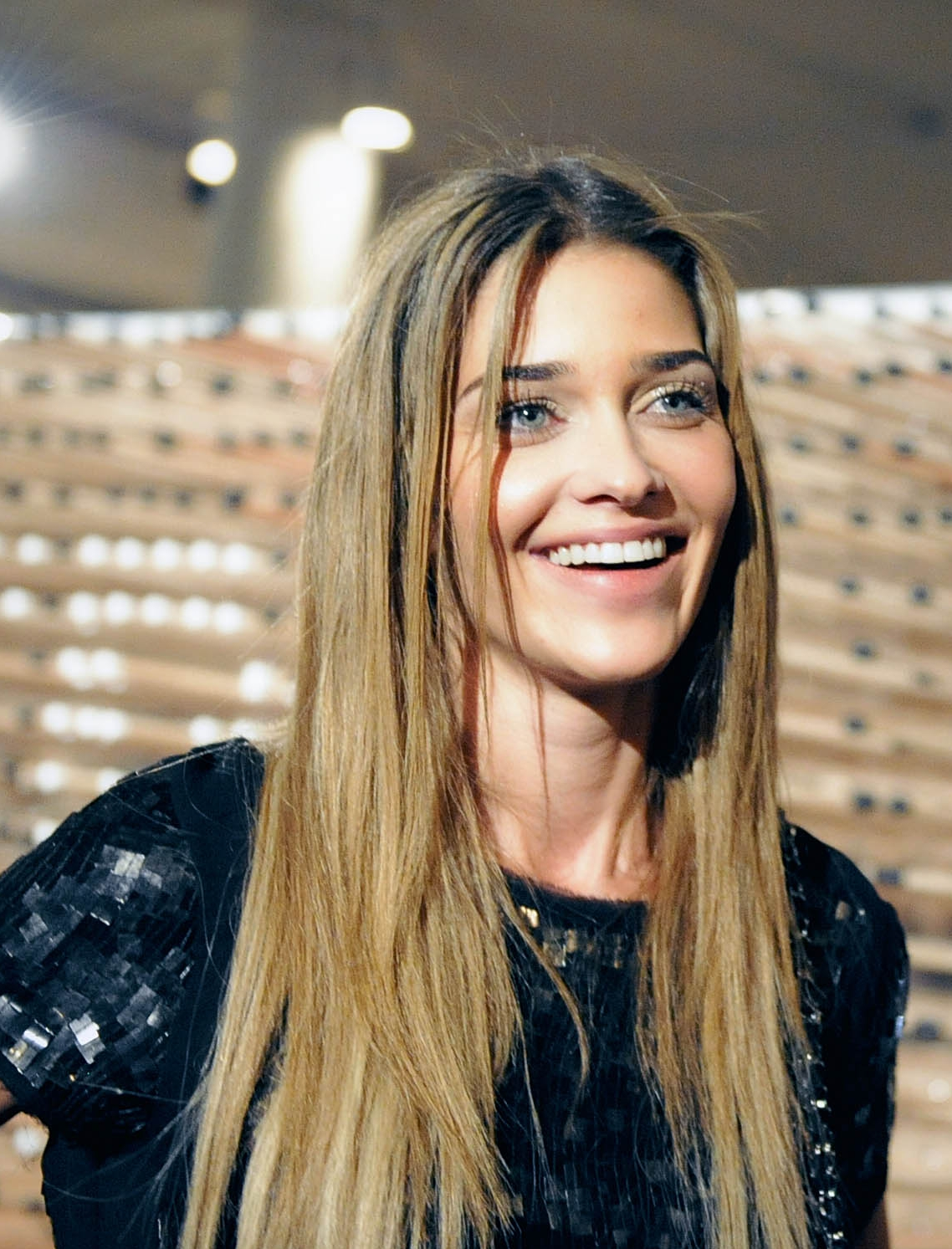
Ana Beatriz Barros

- May 1
  - Jamie Dornan, Northern Irish actor and model
  - Tommy Robredo, Spanish tennis player
  - Darijo Srna, Croatian soccer player
- May 3 – Rebecca Hall, British-American actress
- May 4 – Markus Rogan, Austrian swimmer
- May 5 – Teresa Portela, Spanish canoeist
- May 6
  - Miljan Mrdaković, Serbian footballer (d. 2020)
  - Dilshod Nazarov, Tajikstani hammer thrower
- May 7
  - Ákos Buzsáky, Hungarian footballer
  - Matt Gaetz, American politician
- May 8 – Mark Bedworth, English rugby union footballer
- May 9 – Rachel Boston, American actress
- May 10 – Adebayo Akinfenwa, English footballer
- May 11
  - Cory Monteith, Canadian actor (d. 2013)
  - Jonathan Jackson, American actor
- May 12
  - Donnie Nietes, Filipino boxer
  - Anastasia Rodionova, Russian born-Australian tennis player
- May 13 – Oguchi Onyewu, American soccer player
- May 14 – Ai Shibata, Japanese swimmer
- May 15
  - Layal Abboud, Lebanese singer
  - Alexandra Breckenridge, American actress, voice actress, and photographer
  - Veronica Campbell-Brown, Jamaican athlete
  - Tatsuya Fujiwara, Japanese actor
  - Jessica Sutta, American singer and dancer
- May 16 – Łukasz Kubot, Polish tennis player
- May 17
  - Vjosa Osmani, 5th President of Kosovo
  - Tony Parker, French basketball player
- May 19 – Kevin Amankwaah, English footballer
- May 20
  - Petr Čech, Czech footballer
  - Jessica Raine, English actress
  - Lee Ryol-li, Korean-Japanese boxer
- May 22
  - Hong Yong-jo, North Korean footballer
  - Apolo Ohno, American short track speed skater and actor
- May 24
  - Paul Joseph Watson, British right-wing YouTuber, radio host, writer and conspiracy theorist
- May 25
  - Justin Hodges, Australian rugby league player
  - Alexandr Ivanov, Russian javelin thrower
  - Ezekiel Kemboi, Kenyan athlete
- May 28 – Alexa Davalos, American actress
- May 29
  - Ana Beatriz Barros, Brazilian model
  - Anita Briem, Icelandic actress

== June ==
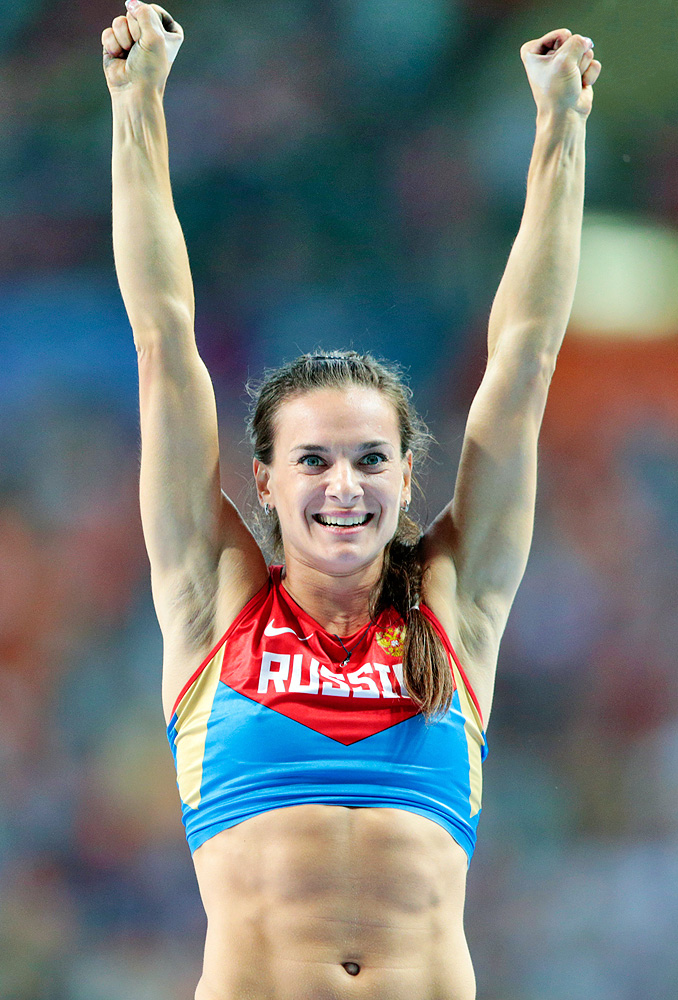
Yelena Isinbayeva

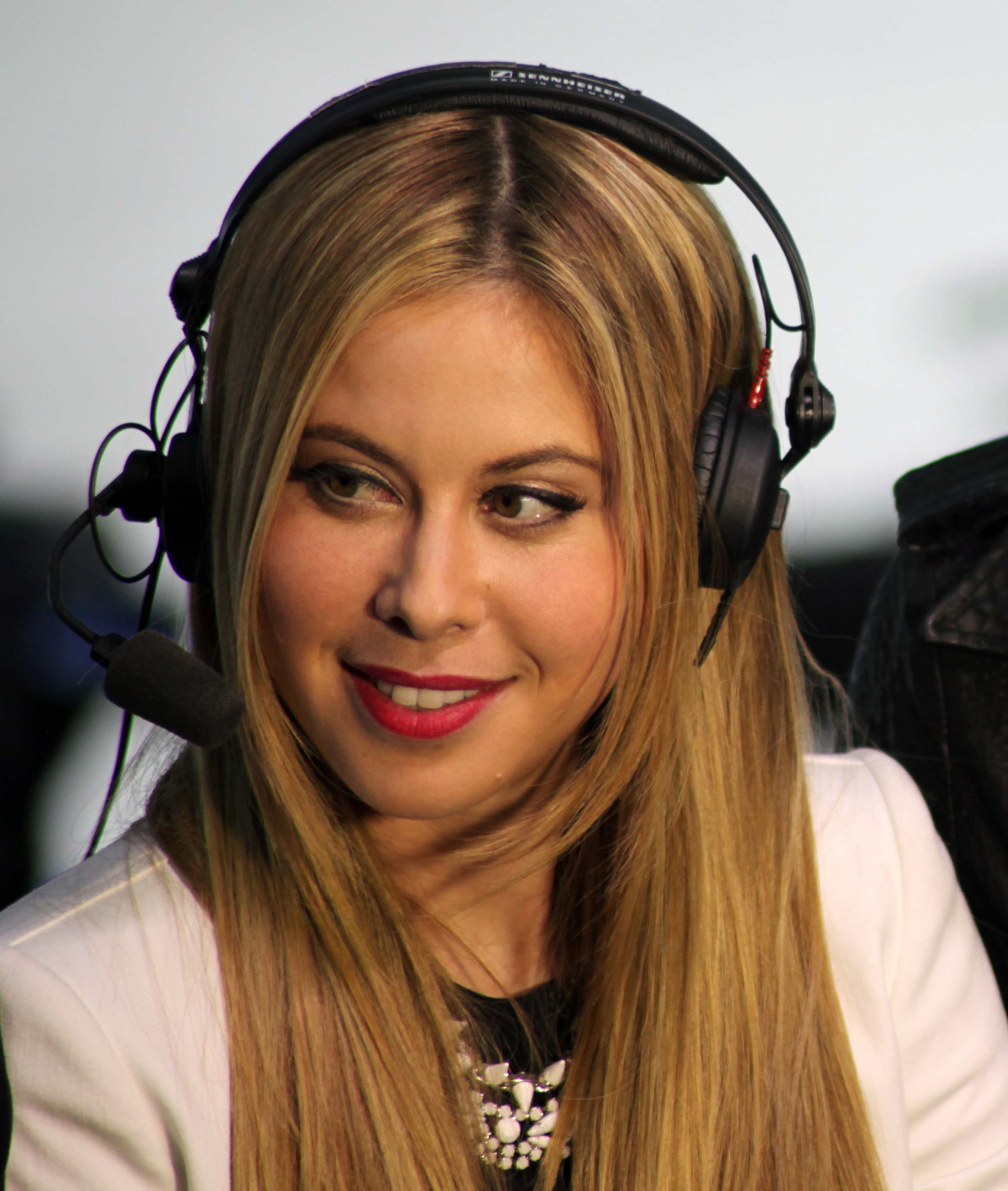
Tara Lipinski

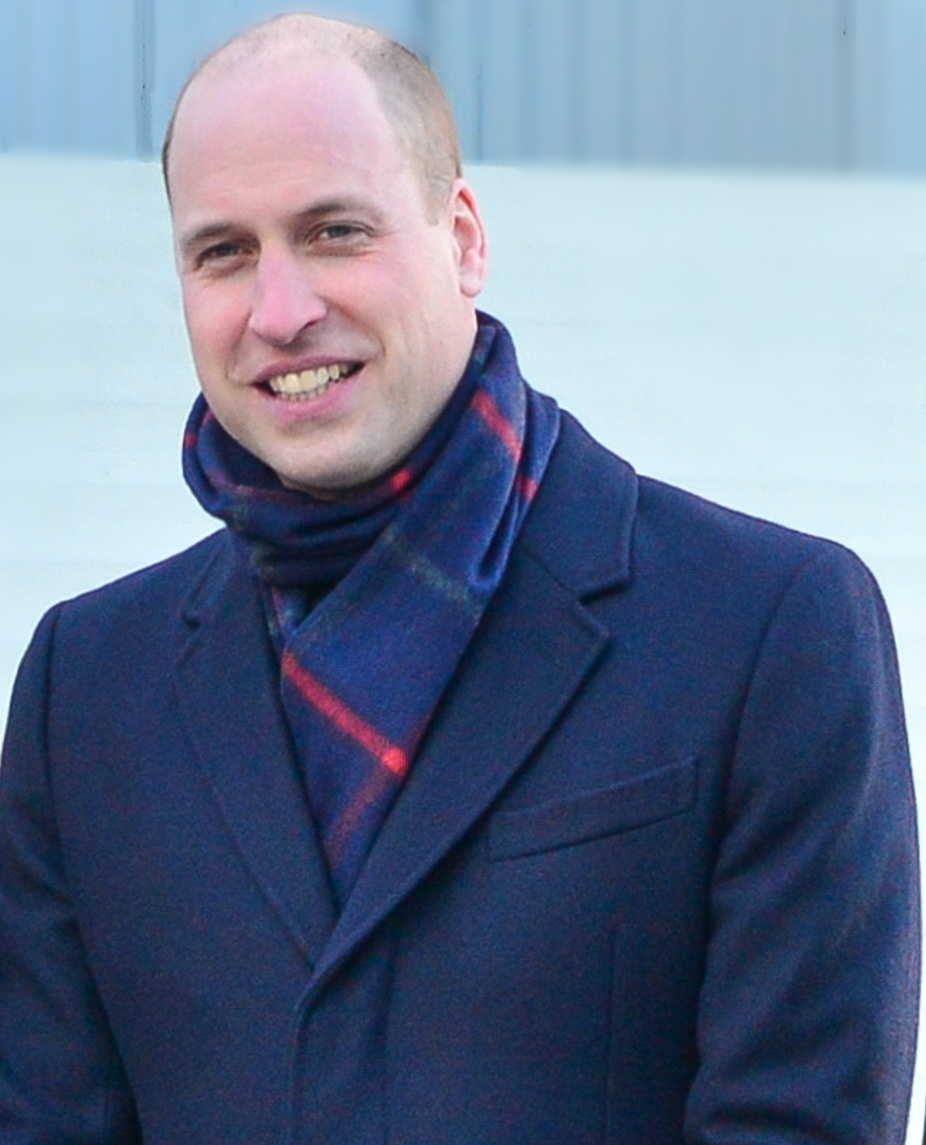
William, Prince of Wales

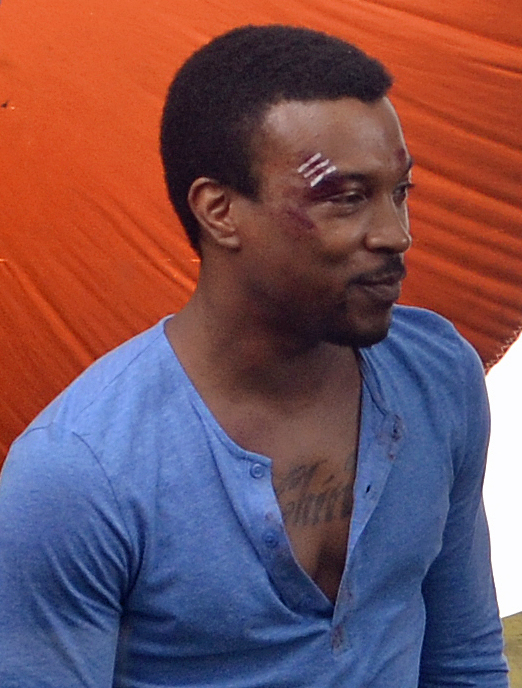
Ashley Walters

- June 1 – Justine Henin, Belgian tennis player
- June 2 – Jewel Staite, Canadian actress
- June 3
  - Gaetano D'Agostino, Italian football player and coach
  - Yelena Isinbayeva, Russian athlete
- June 4 – MC Jin, American rapper
- June 5
  - Achille Emaná, Cameroonian footballer
  - Zvjezdan Misimović, Bosnian footballer
- June 8 – Nadia Petrova, Russian tennis player
- June 10
  - Laleh, Swedish singer-songwriter
  - Tara Lipinski, American figure skater
  - Princess Madeleine of Sweden
- June 11
  - Eldar Rønning, Norwegian cross-country skier
  - Diana Taurasi, American basketball player
- June 12 – Jason David, American football player
- June 13 – Kenenisa Bekele, Ethiopian long-distance runner
- June 14
  - Jamie Green, English racing driver
  - Lang Lang, Chinese pianist
- June 17 – Jodie Whittaker, English actress
- June 18 – Marco Borriello, Italian football player
- June 20
  - Example, British musician
  - April Ross, American beach volleyball player
- June 21
  - William, Prince of Wales, heir to the British throne
  - Danny Buijs, Dutch football manager and former player
- June 22 – Soraia Chaves, Portuguese actress and model
- June 23
  - Joona Puhakka, Finnish diver
  - Denys Shelikhov, Ukrainian football player
- June 24
  - Natasa Dusev-Janics, Serbian-Hungarian sprint canoeist
  - Joanna Kulig, Polish actress and singer
  - Kevin Nolan, English professional footballer
- June 25
  - Rain, South Korean singer-songwriter, actor, and music producer
  - Ryan Block, American technology entrepreneur
  - Mikhail Youzhny, Russian tennis player
  - Cécile Cassel, French actress and singer
- June 27
  - Laura Dre, German-Filipina electronic musician, singer-songwriter and music producer
- June 28
  - Jung Gyu-woon, South Korean actor
  - Grazi Massafera, Brazilian actress and model
- June 29
  - Lily Rabe, American actress
  - Kwon Yul, South Korean actor
- June 30
  - Lizzy Caplan, American actress
  - Ashley Walters, British rapper, songwriter and actor
  - Büşra Pekin, Turkish actress

== July ==
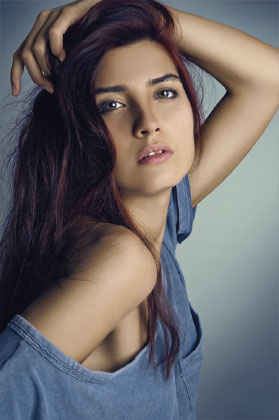
Tuba Büyüküstün

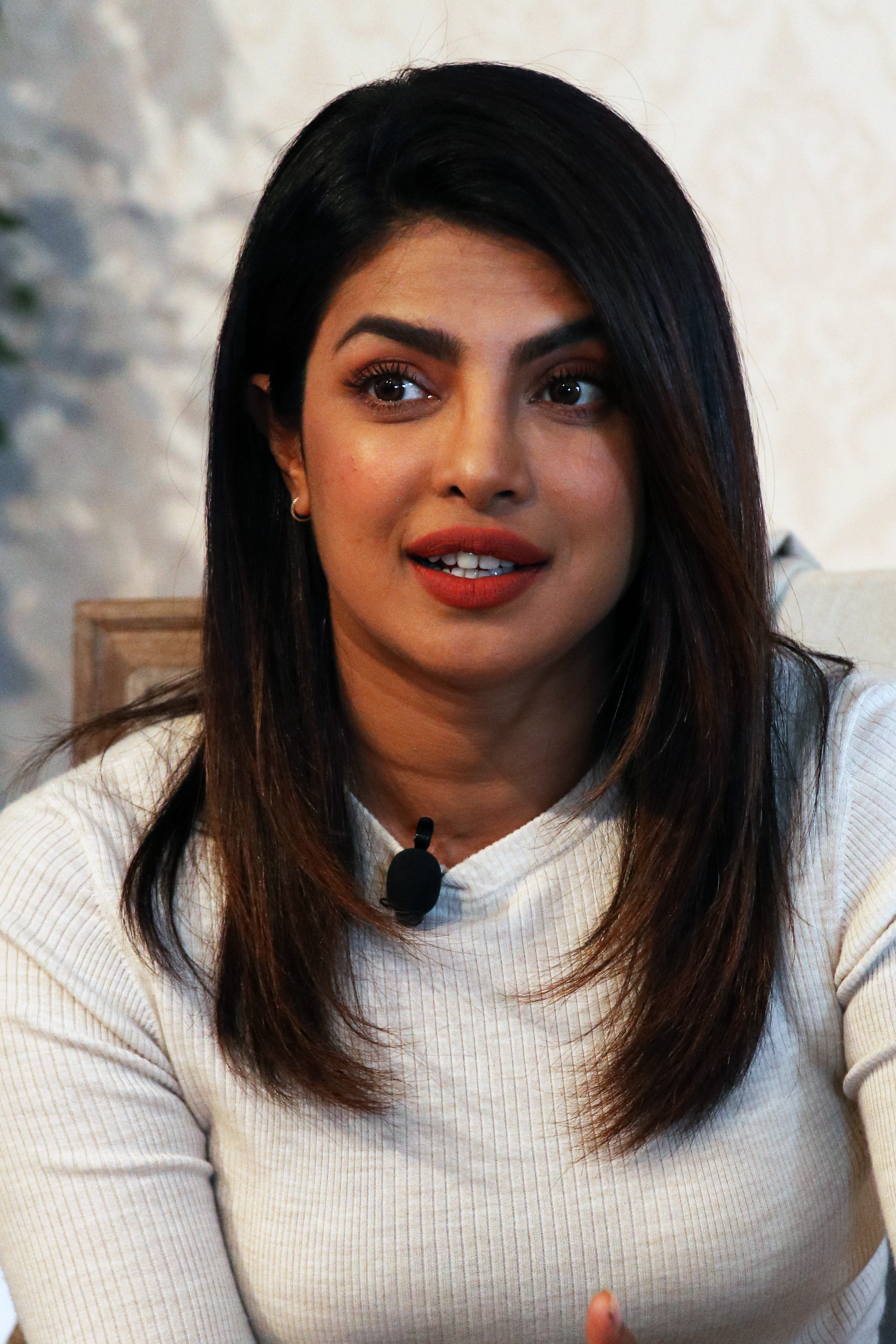
Priyanka Chopra

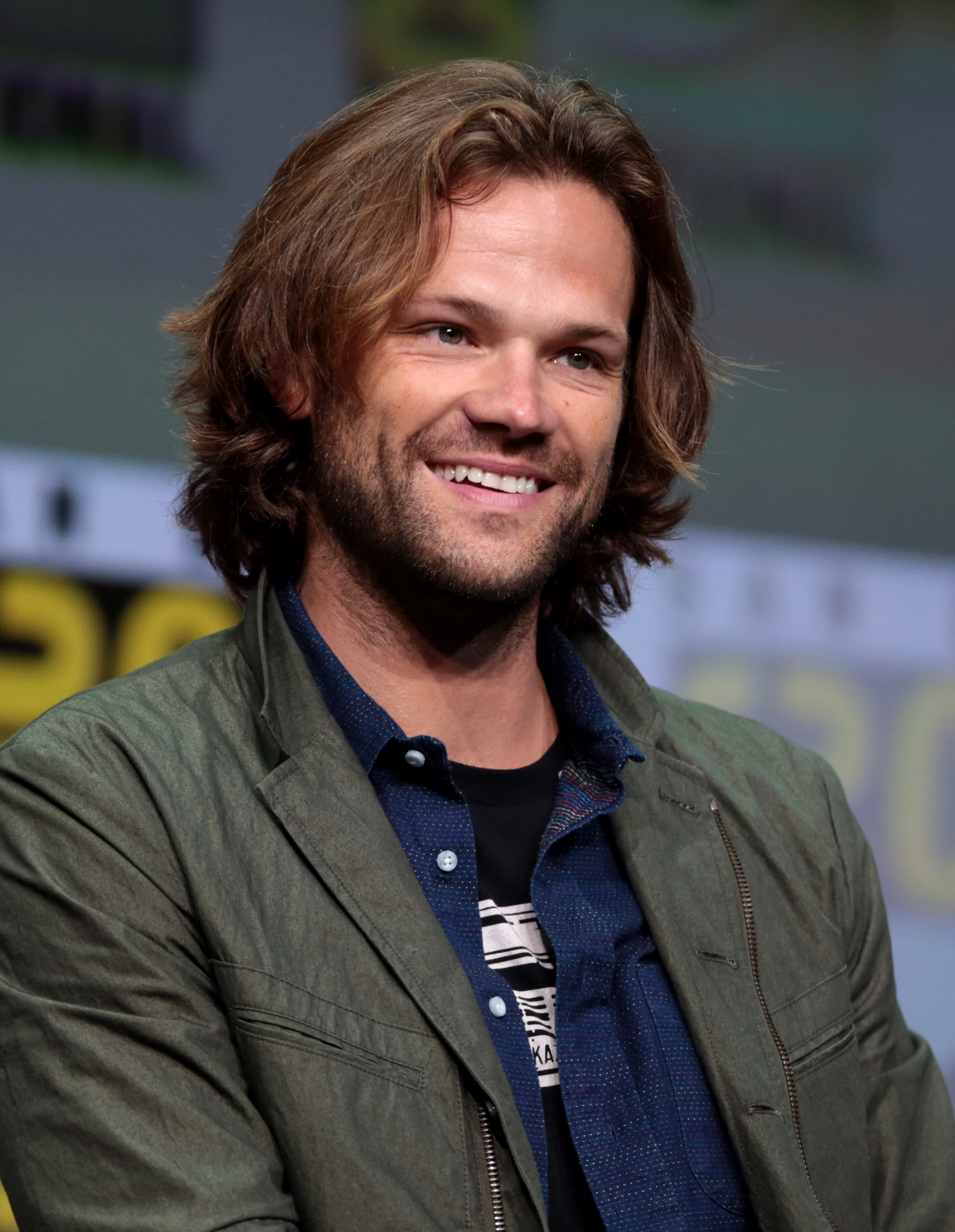
Jared Padalecki

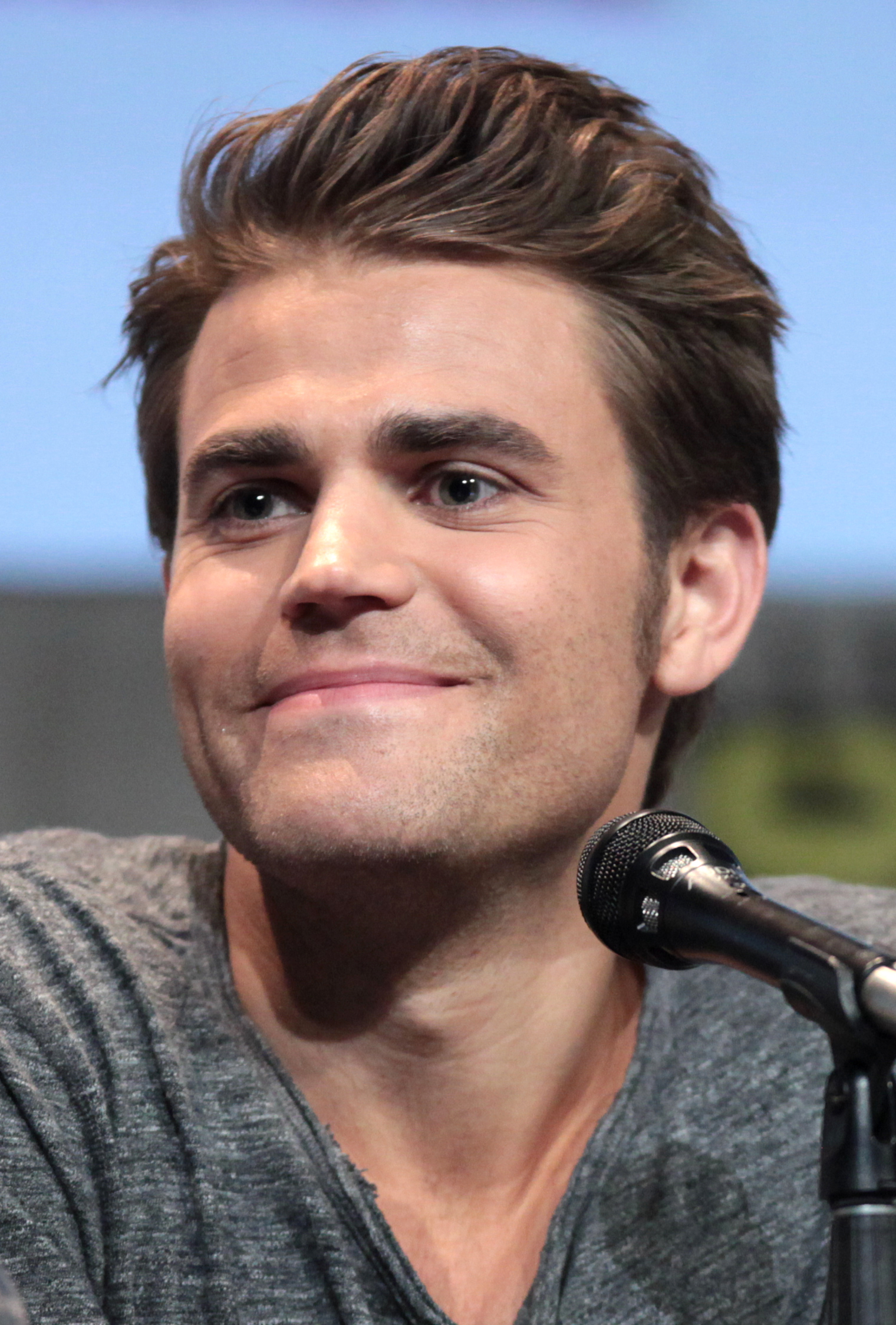
Paul Wesley

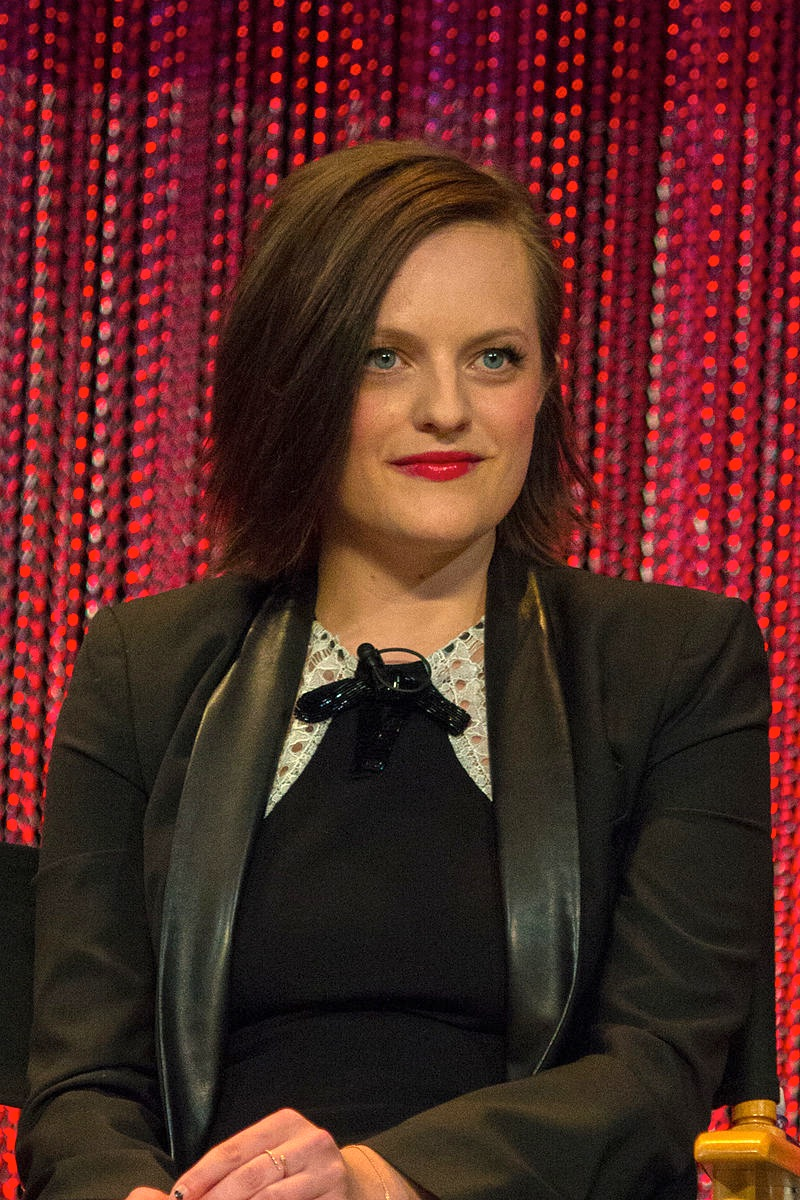
Elisabeth Moss

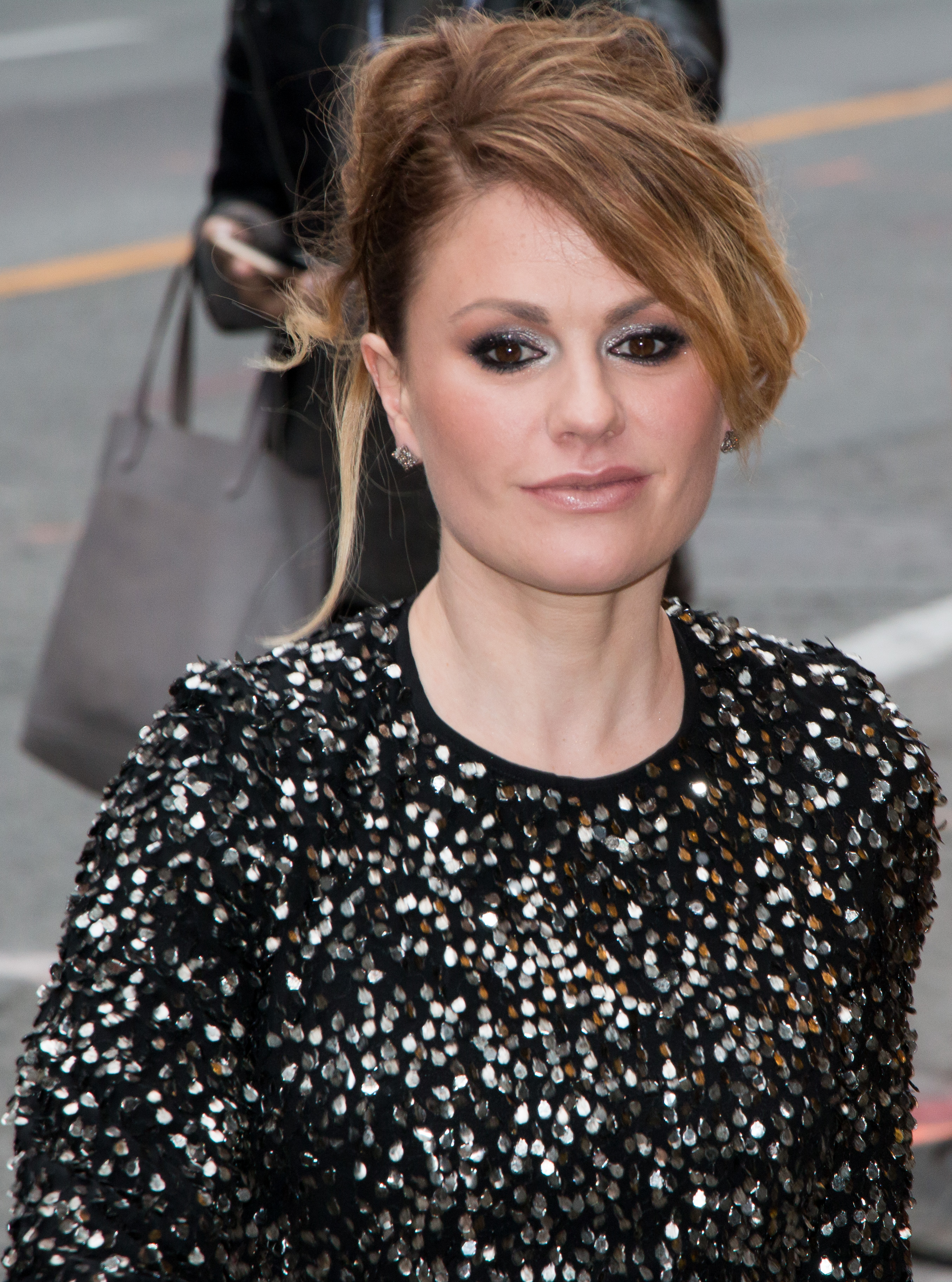
Anna Paquin

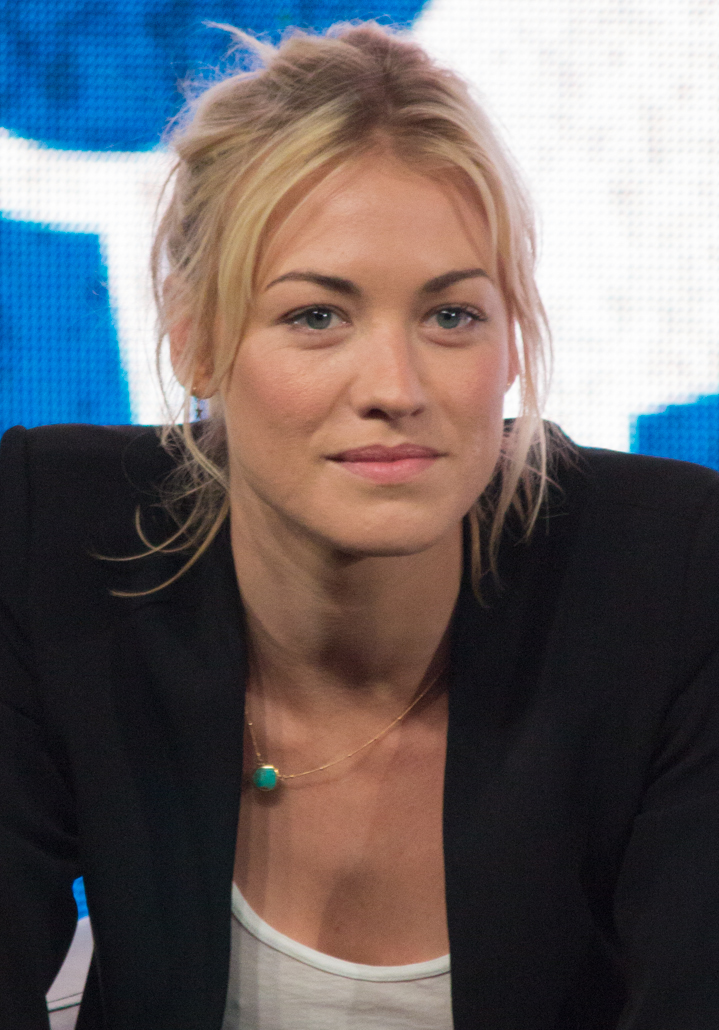
Yvonne Strahovski

- July 1
  - Hilarie Burton, American actress and businesswoman
  - Russell Holmes, American volleyball player
  - Johann Tschopp, Swiss mountain bike racer
  - Cat Zingano, American mixed martial artist
- July 2 – Beste Bereket, Turkish actress
- July 3 – Kanika, Indian actress and singer
- July 4
  - Michael Sorrentino, American model, actor, and author
  - Antonio Reguero, Spanish footballer
  - Zoran Ljubinković, Serbian footballer
- July 5
  - Tuba Büyüküstün, Turkish actress
  - Philippe Gilbert, Belgian cyclist
  - Alberto Gilardino, Italian football manager
  - Beno Udrih, Slovenian basketball player
- July 7
  - Marcelo Calero, Brazilian diplomat and politician
  - Jan Laštůvka, Czech footballer
  - Rosana, Brazilian footballer
- July 8
  - Sophia Bush, American actress
  - Miguel Thiré, Brazilian actor
- July 9
  - Slaine Kelly, Irish actress
  - Sidão, Brazilian volleyball player
  - Toby Kebbell, English actor
- July 11 – Max Rhyser, Danish-American-Israeli model, stage, television, and film actor
- July 12 – Antonio Cassano, Italian footballer
- July 13
  - Shin-Soo Choo, South Korean baseball player
  - Yadier Molina, Puerto Rican baseball player
- July 15 – Maksym Khvorost, Ukrainian épée fencer
- July 16
  - Steve Hooker, Australian pole vaulter
  - Carli Lloyd, American soccer player
  - Aamna Sharif, Indian actress
  - Kellie Wells, American athlete
- July 18
  - Ryan Cabrera, Colombian-American pop rock musician
  - Priyanka Chopra, Indian actress and beauty queen
  - Carlo Costly, Honduran footballer
- July 19
  - Jared Padalecki, American actor
  - Lý Nhã Kỳ, Vietnamese actress, model and businesswoman
- July 22 – Lafaele Moala, Tongan footballer
- July 23 – Paul Wesley, American actor
- July 24
  - Elisabeth Moss, American actress
  - Anna Paquin, Canadian-born New Zealand actress
- July 25
  - Jared Golden, American politician
  - Brad Renfro, American actor (d. 2008)
- July 27
  - Gévrise Émane, Cameroonian born-French judoka
  - Wolé Parks, American actor
- July 29
  - Prince Azim of Brunei, Brunei royal and film producer (d. 2020)
  - Allison Mack, German-American actress
- July 30
  - James Anderson, English cricketer
  - Nesrin Cavadzade, Azerbaijani-Turkish actress
  - Yvonne Strahovski, Australian actress
- July 31
  - Marc López, Spanish tennis player
  - Anabel Medina Garrigues, Spanish tennis player and coach

== August ==
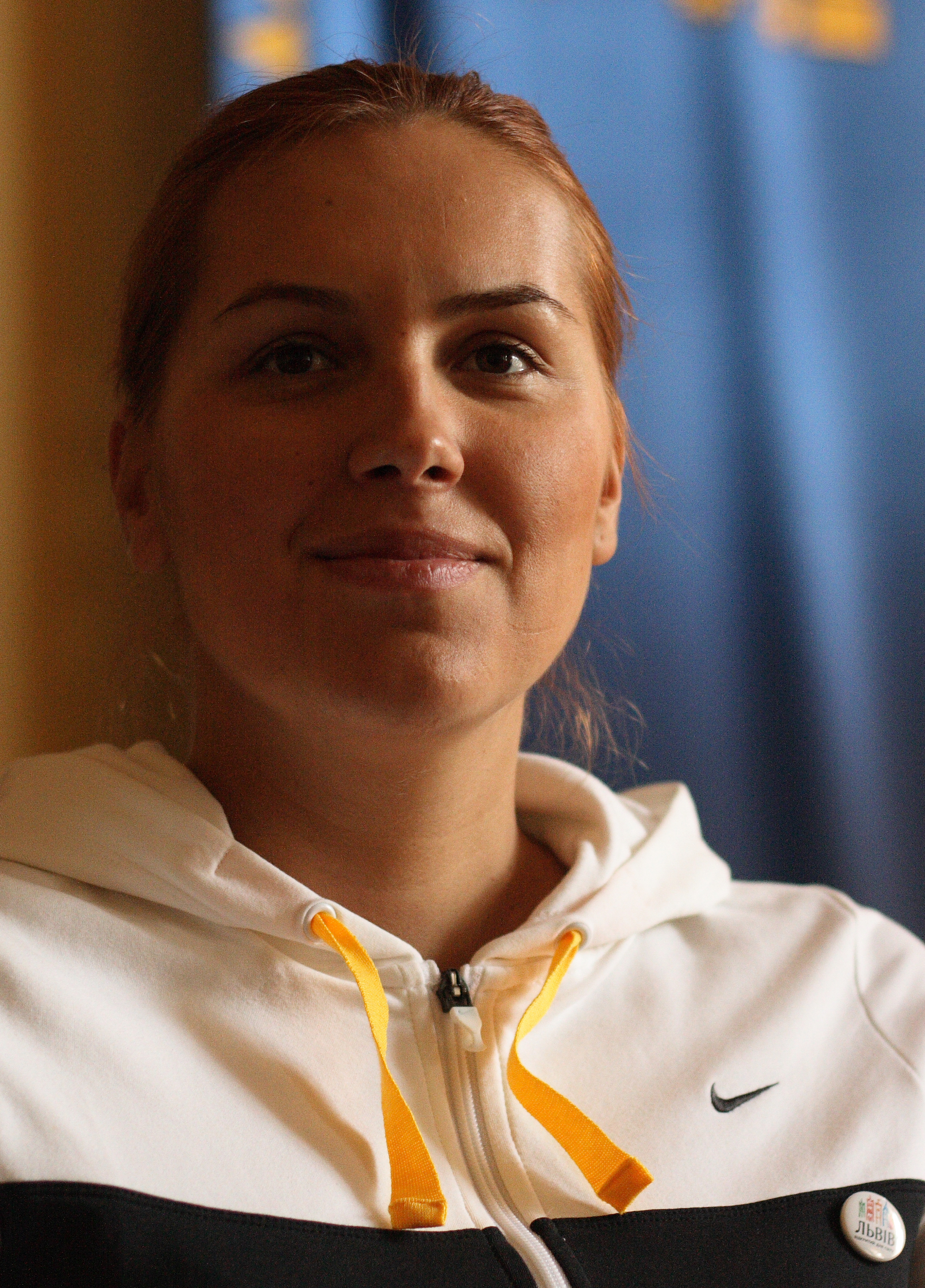
Yana Klochkova

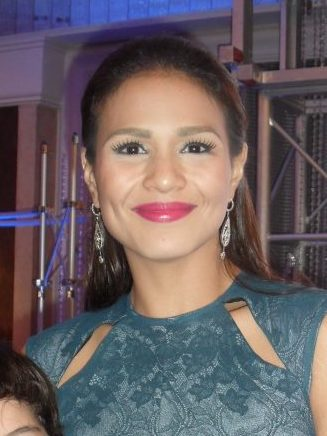
Iza Calzado

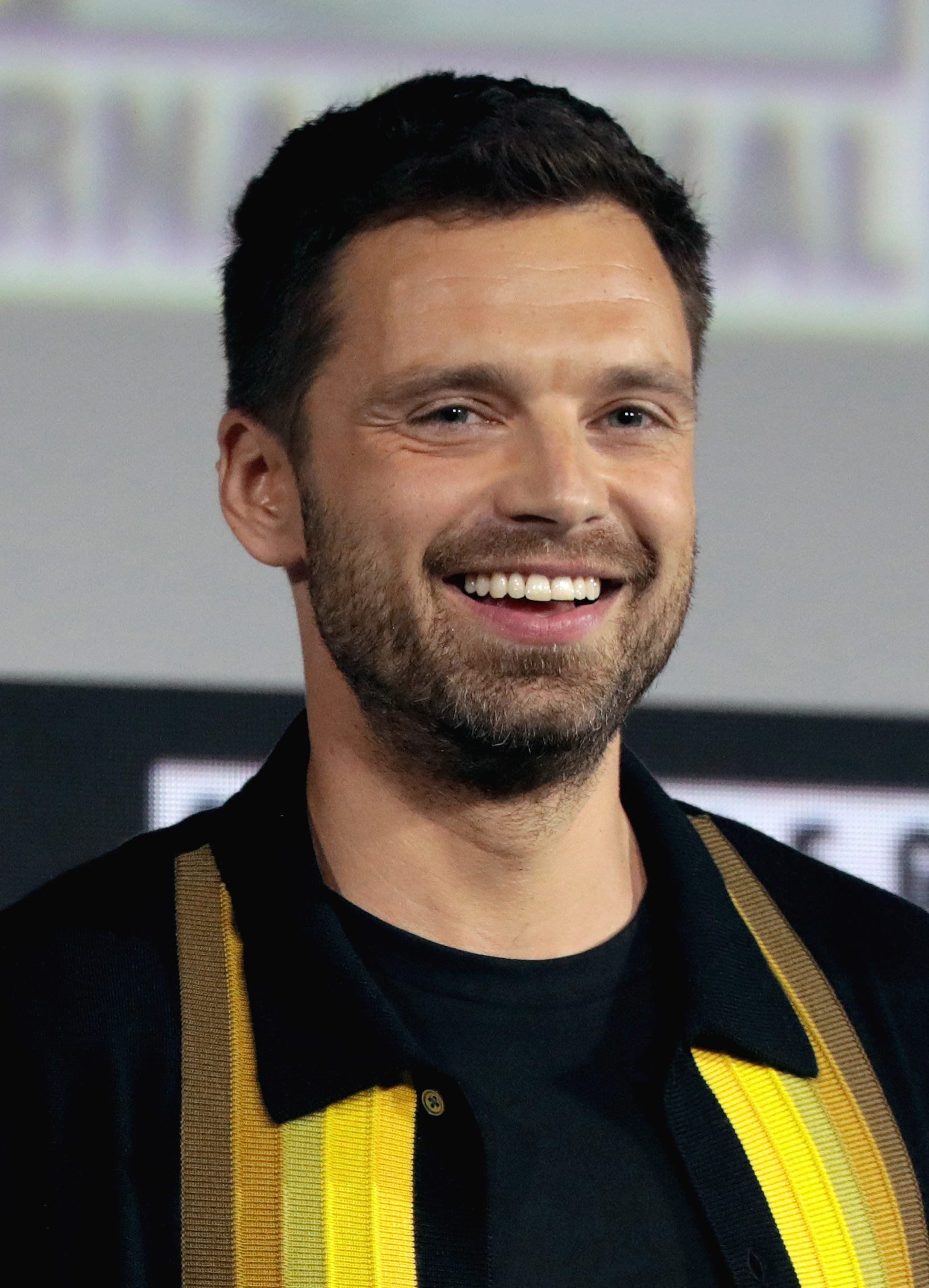
Sebastian Stan

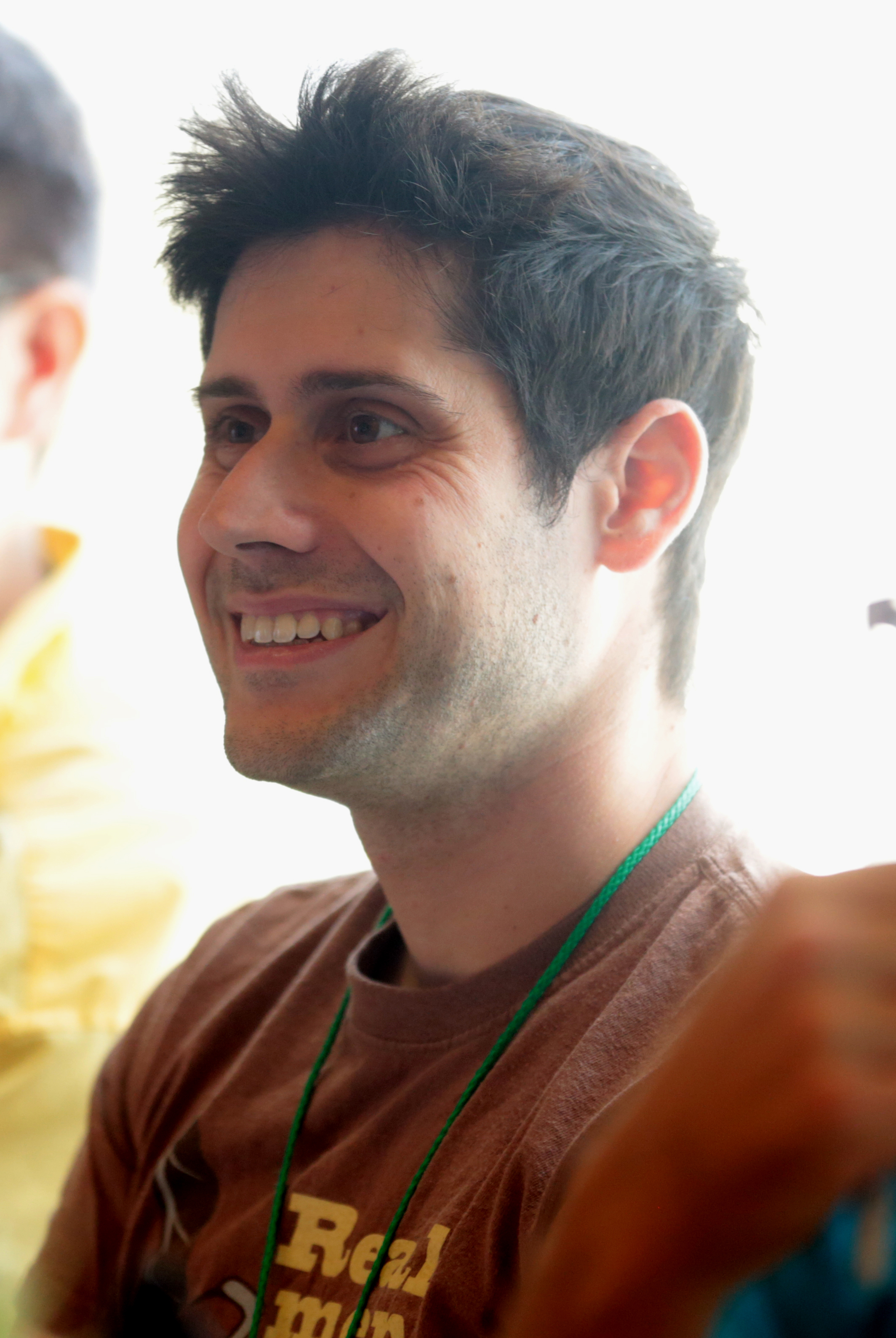
Benjamin Diskin

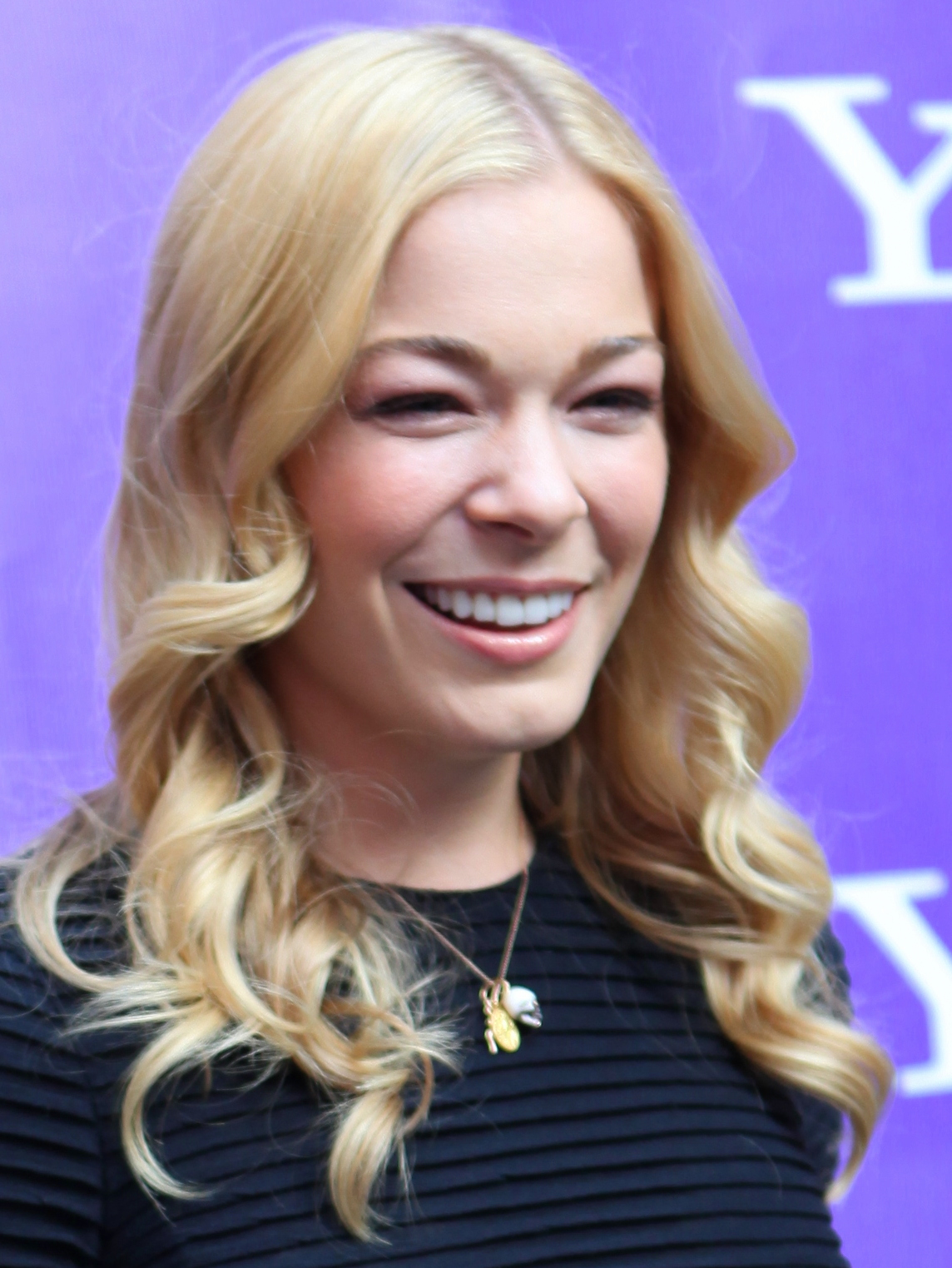
LeAnn Rimes

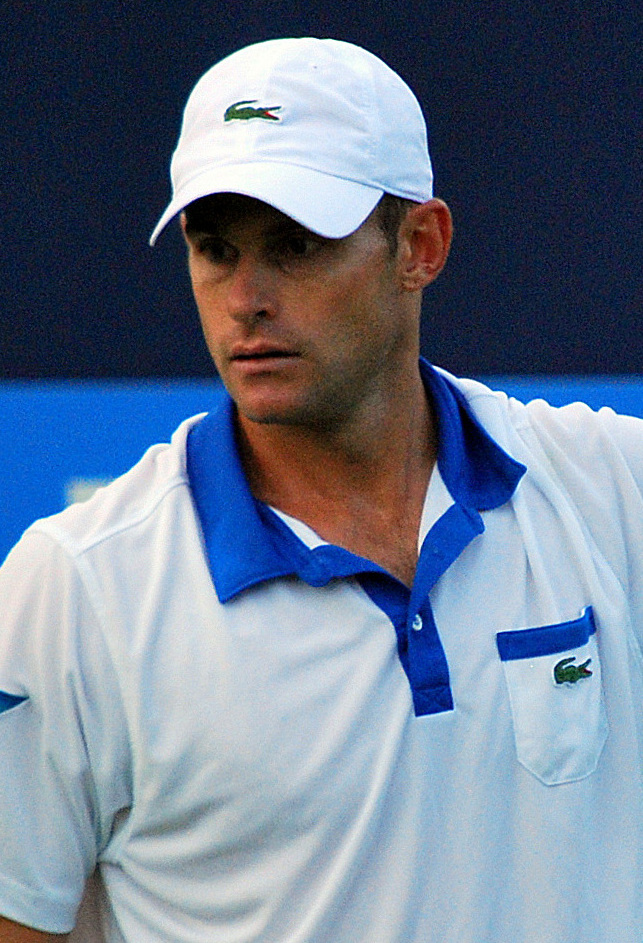
Andy Roddick

- August 2 – Hélder Postiga, Portuguese footballer
- August 5 – Lolo Jones, American track and field athlete
- August 6 – Romola Garai, English actress
- August 7
  - Brit Marling, American actress
  - Yana Klochkova, Ukrainian swimmer
  - Marco Melandri, Italian motorcycle racer
  - Abbie Cornish, Australian actress and rapper
- August 9 – Tyson Gay, American athlete
- August 10
  - Devon Aoki, American supermodel and actress
  - Şennur Demir, Turkish kickboxer
  - Shaun Murphy, English snooker player
- August 12 – Jon Olsson, Swedish freestyle skier
- August 13
  - Shani Davis, American speed skater
  - Gary McSheffrey, English footballer
  - Sarah Huckabee Sanders, American political consultant and press secretary
  - Sebastian Stan, Romanian-American actor
- August 16 – Joleon Lescott, English footballer
- August 17
  - Jon Olsson, Swedish freestyle skier
  - Mark Salling, American actor (d. 2018)
- August 19
  - Melissa Fumero, American actress
  - Stipe Miocic, American mixed martial artist
  - Erika Christensen, American actress and singer
- August 20
  - Arisa, Italian singer and actress
  - Mijaín López, Cuban Greco-Roman wrestler
  - Meghan Ory, Canadian actress
- August 23 – Natalie Coughlin, American Olympic swimmer
- August 24 – Kim Källström, Swedish footballer
- August 25
  - Benjamin Diskin, American actor and voice actor
  - Jung Jae-sung, South Korean badminton player (d. 2018)
- August 26
  - Nikolay Apalikov, Russian volleyball player
  - Priscilla Lopes-Schliep, Canadian hurdler
- August 27 – Bergüzar Korel, Turkish actress
- August 28
  - Thiago Motta, Brazilian born-Italian football player and coach
  - LeAnn Rimes, American country singer
- August 29
  - Marina Aleksandrova, Russian actress
  - Carlos Delfino, Argentine basketball player
  - Vincent Enyeama, Nigerian football goalkeeper
- August 30
  - Alina Dumitru, Romanian judoka
  - Andy Roddick, American tennis player
- August 31
  - Ian Crocker, American Olympic swimmer
  - José Manuel Reina Páez, Spanish footballer

== September ==
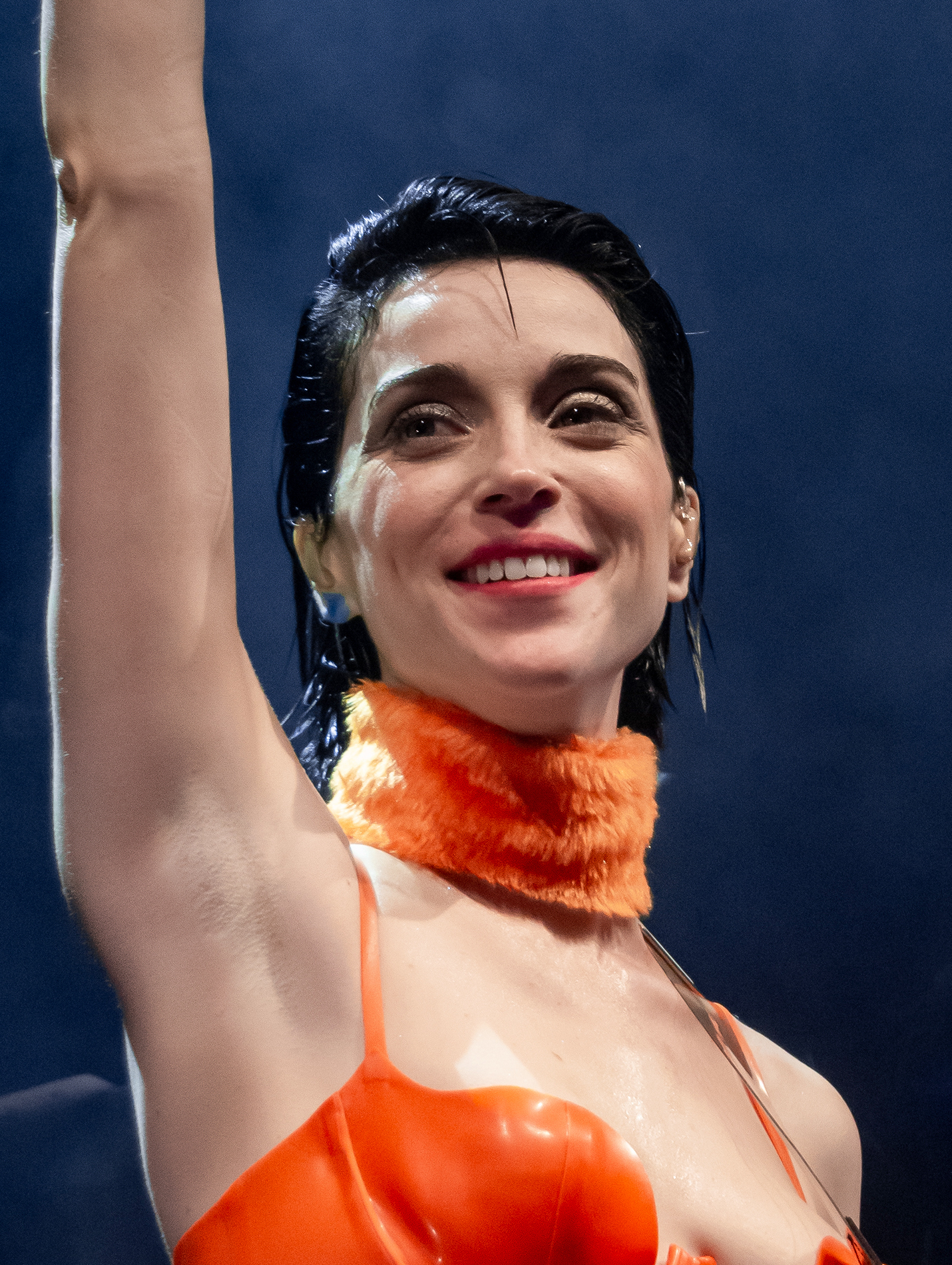
St. Vincent

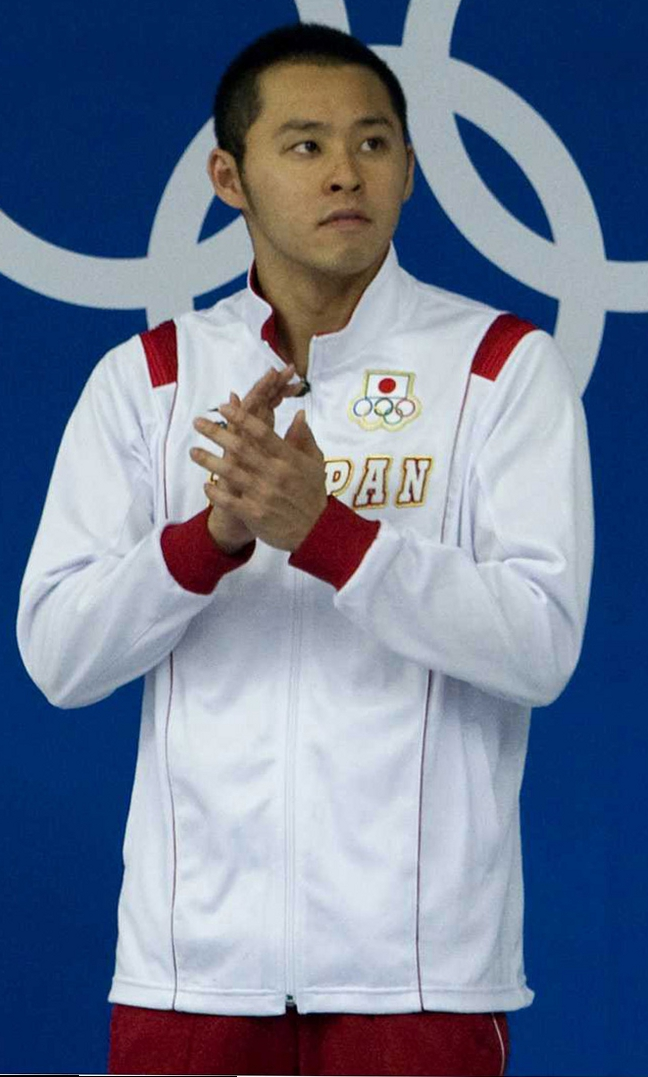
Kosuke Kitajima

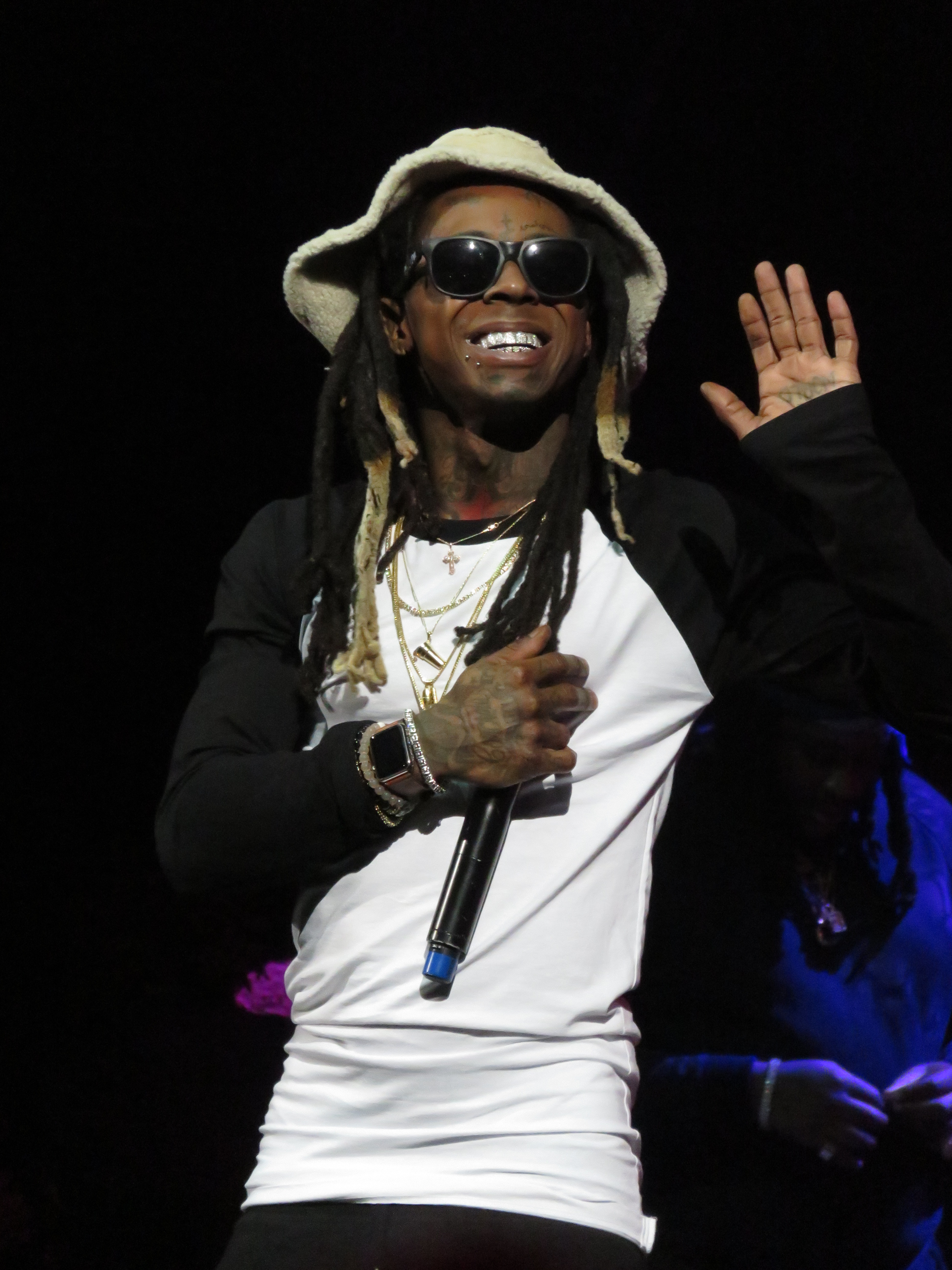
Lil Wayne

- September 1 – Jeffrey Buttle, Canadian figure skater
- September 3 – Sarah Burke, Canadian freestyle skier (d. 2012)
- September 7 – Emese Szász-Kovács, Hungarian fencer
- September 9 – Ai Otsuka, Japanese singer, songwriter, pianist and actress
- September 10
  - Misty Copeland, American ballet dancer
  - Bret Iwan, American voice actor
  - Naldo, Brazilian footballer
- September 11
  - Elvan Abeylegesse, Ethiopian born-Turkish long distance runner
  - Shriya Saran, Indian actress
- September 12
  - Isabelle Caro, French model and actress (d. 2010)
  - Max Hoff, German sprint canoeist
- September 13
  - Soraya Arnelas, Spanish singer
  - Nenê, Brazilian basketball player
- September 16 – Leon Britton, English footballer
- September 19 – Skepta, English MC and record producer
- September 21 - Dominic Perrottet, Australian politician, Premier of New South Wales
- September 22
  - Masud Gharahkhani, Iranian-Norwegian politician, President of the Storting
  - Kosuke Kitajima, Japanese swimmer
  - Billie Piper, English actress and singer
- September 23 – Alyssa Sutherland, Australian actress and model
- September 25 – Hyun Bin, Korean actor
  - Maarten Stekelenburg, Dutch footballer
- September 26 – Betty Sun, Chinese actress
- September 27
  - Anna Camp, American actress
  - Markus Rosenberg, Swedish footballer
  - Abhinav Shukla, Indian actor and model
  - Lil Wayne, African-American rapper
- September 28
  - Abhinav Bindra, Indian shooter
  - Ranbir Kapoor, Indian actor
  - Emeka Okafor, American basketball player
  - Anderson Varejão, American basketball player
  - St. Vincent, American singer, songwriter and multi-instrumentalist
- September 29 – Amy Williams, British Olympic medallist
- September 30
  - Lacey Chabert, American actress
  - Li Xiaolu, Chinese actress

== October ==
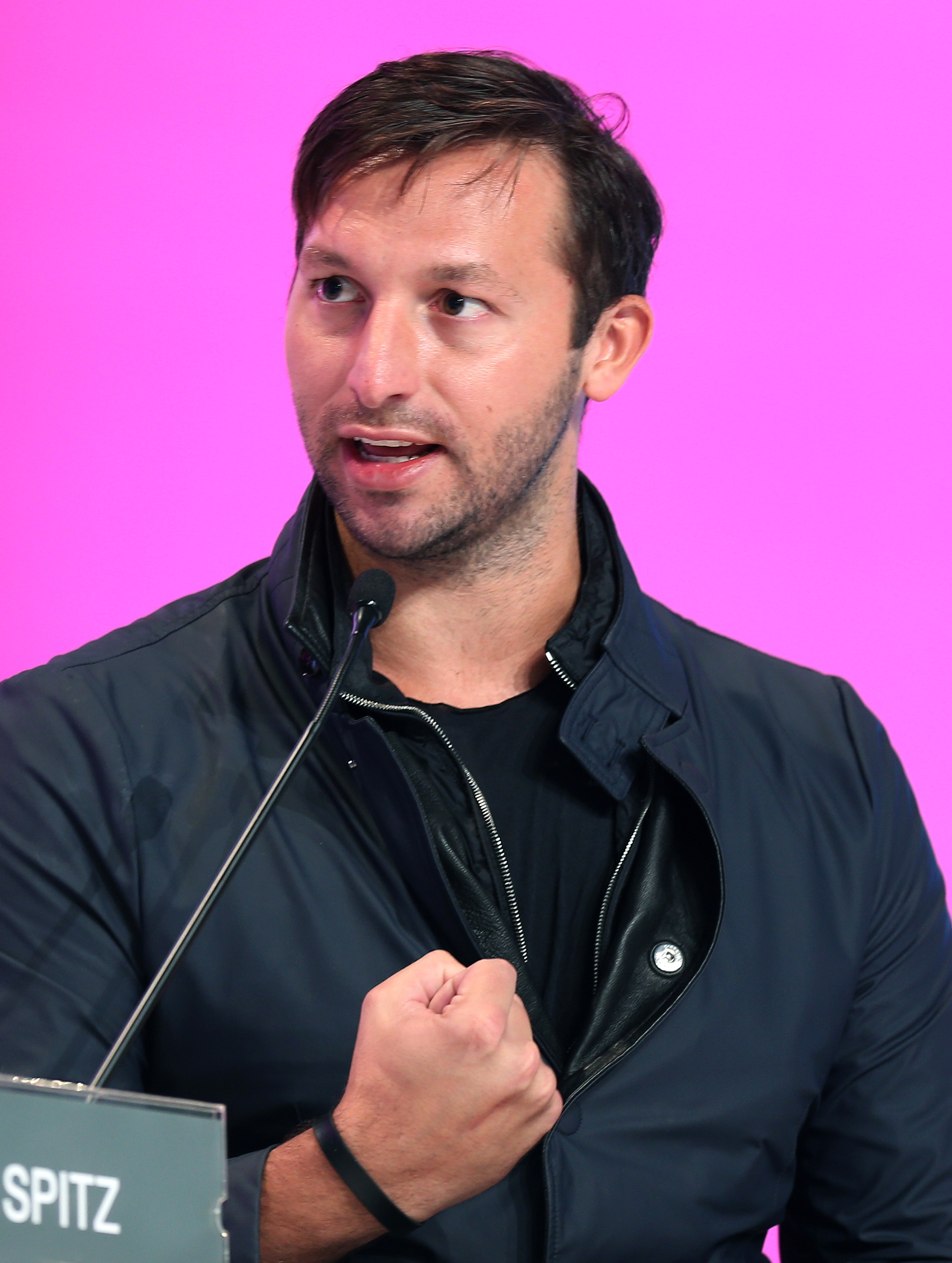
Ian Thorpe

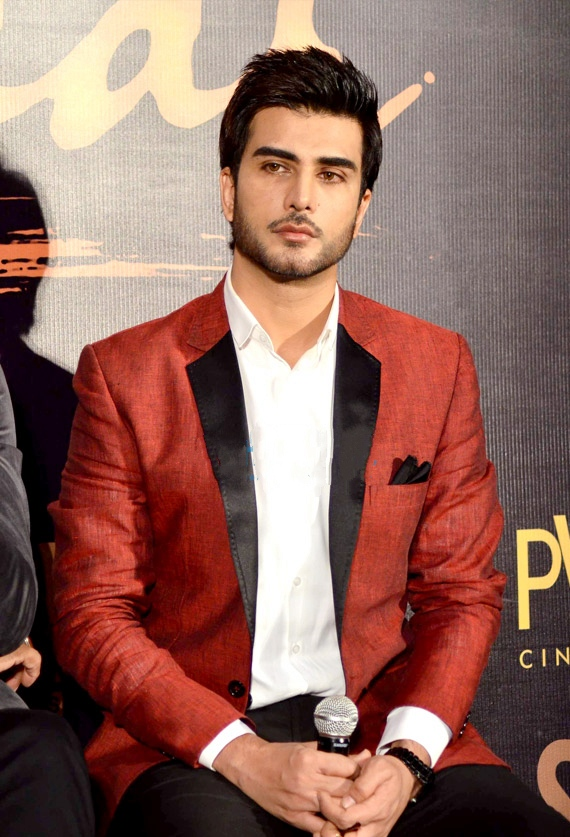
Imran Abbas

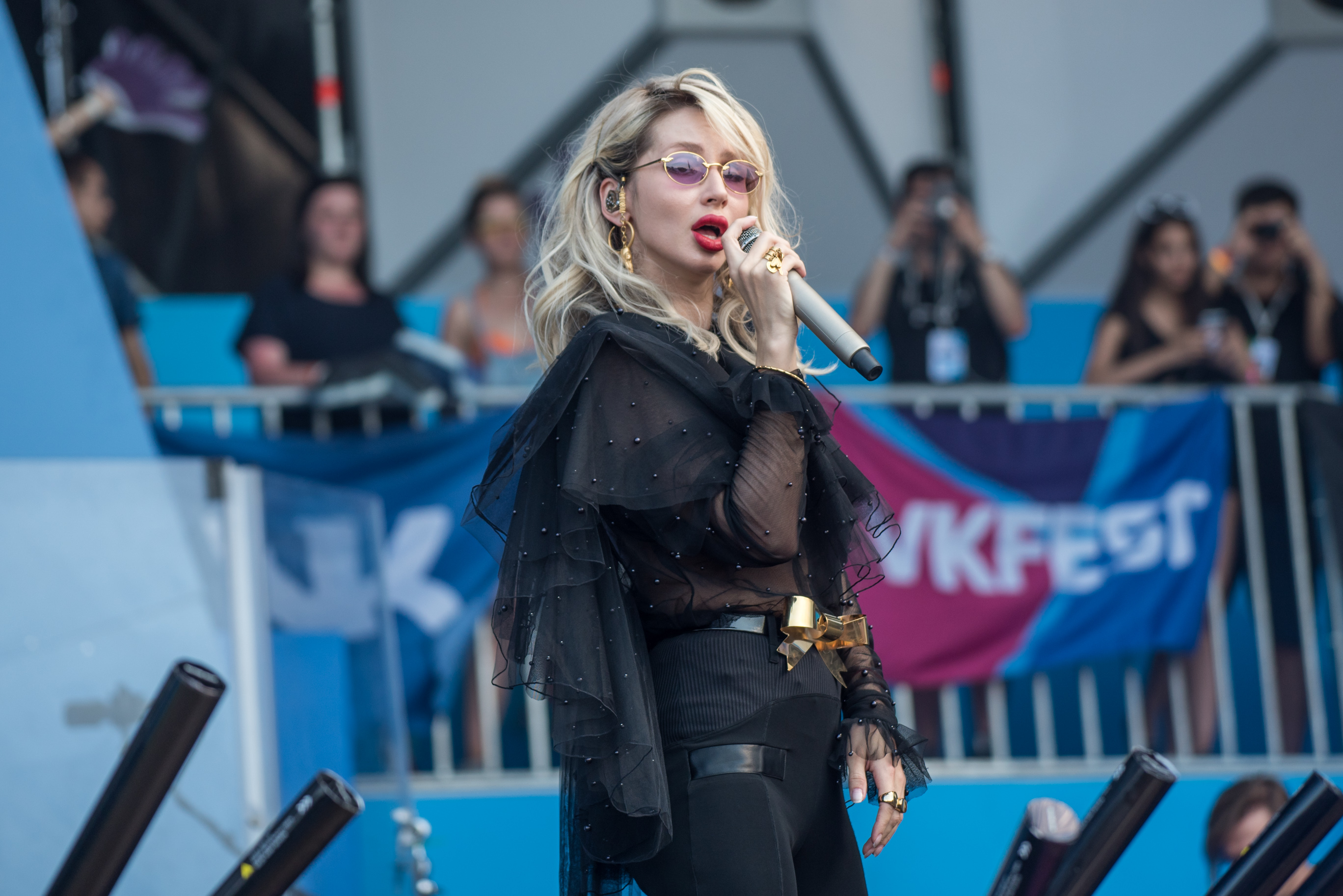
Svetlana Loboda

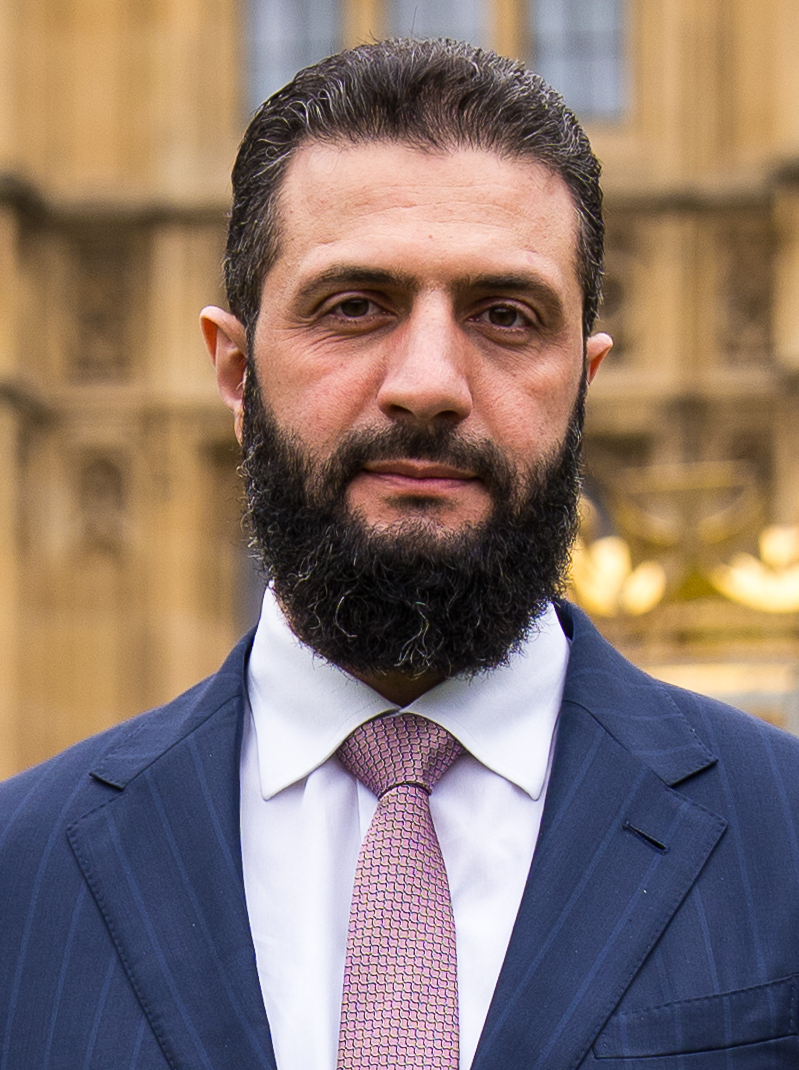
Ahmed al-Sharaa

- October 2 – Tyson Chandler, American basketball player
- October 3 – Server Djeparov, Uzbek footballer
- October 4 – Ilhan Omar, Somali born-American politician
- October 5 – Zhang Yining, Chinese table tennis player
- October 6 – Levon Aronian, Armenian chess Grandmaster
- October 7
  - Madjid Bougherra, Algerian footballer
  - Jermain Defoe, English footballer
  - Li Yundi, Chinese pianist
- October 8
  - Princess Siribhachudabhorn of Thailand
  - Annemiek van Vleuten, Dutch road bicycle racer
- October 9 – Travis Rice, American snowboarder
- October 10
  - David Cal, Spanish sprint canoeist
  - Dan Stevens, English actor
- October 13 – Ian Thorpe, Australian swimmer
- October 15
  - Imran Abbas Naqvi, Pakistani Actor/Model/Singer
  - Saif Saaeed Shaheen, Qatarian athlete
  - Kirsten Wild, Dutch racing cyclist
- October 16 – Svetlana Loboda, Ukrainian singer and composer
- October 19 – Louis Oosthuizen, South African golfer
- October 20 – Johan Lora, Dominican international footballer
- October 21 – Lee Chong Wei, Malaysian badminton player
- October 26
  - Nicola Adams, English boxer
  - Matt Smith, English actor
- October 28 – Özge Ulusoy, Turkish actress, model and ballerina
- October 29 – Ahmed al-Sharaa, Syrian politician and former military commander, President of Syria
- October 30
  - Jon Foo, English actor and martial artist
  - Clémence Poésy, French actress and fashion model

== November ==
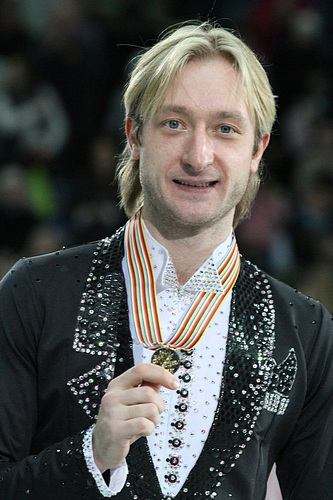
Evgeni Plushenko

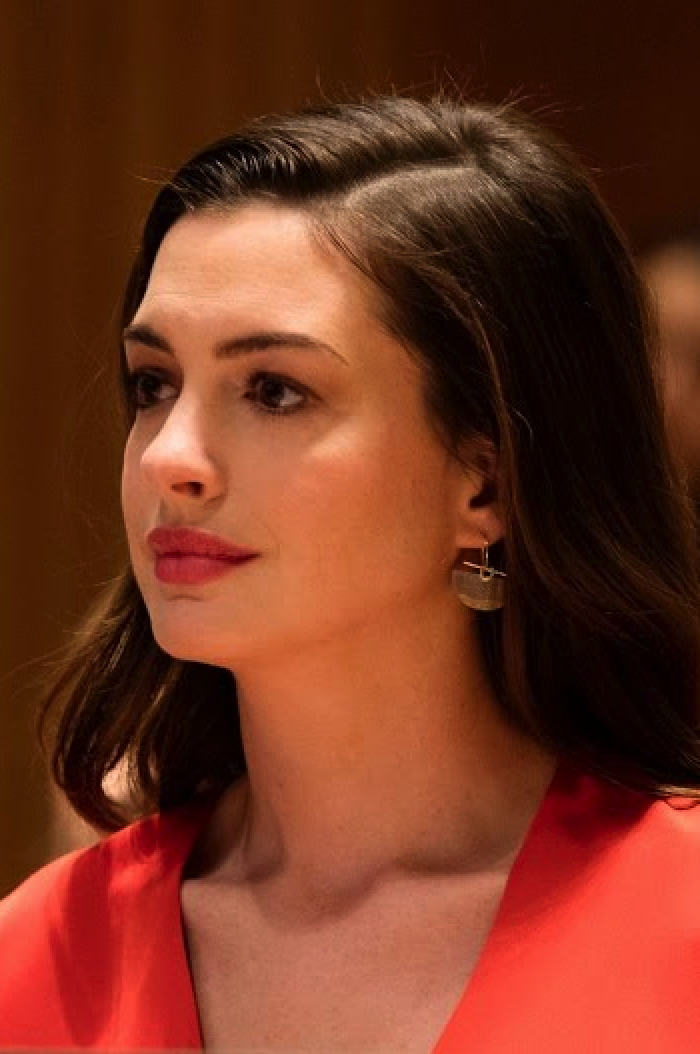
Anne Hathaway

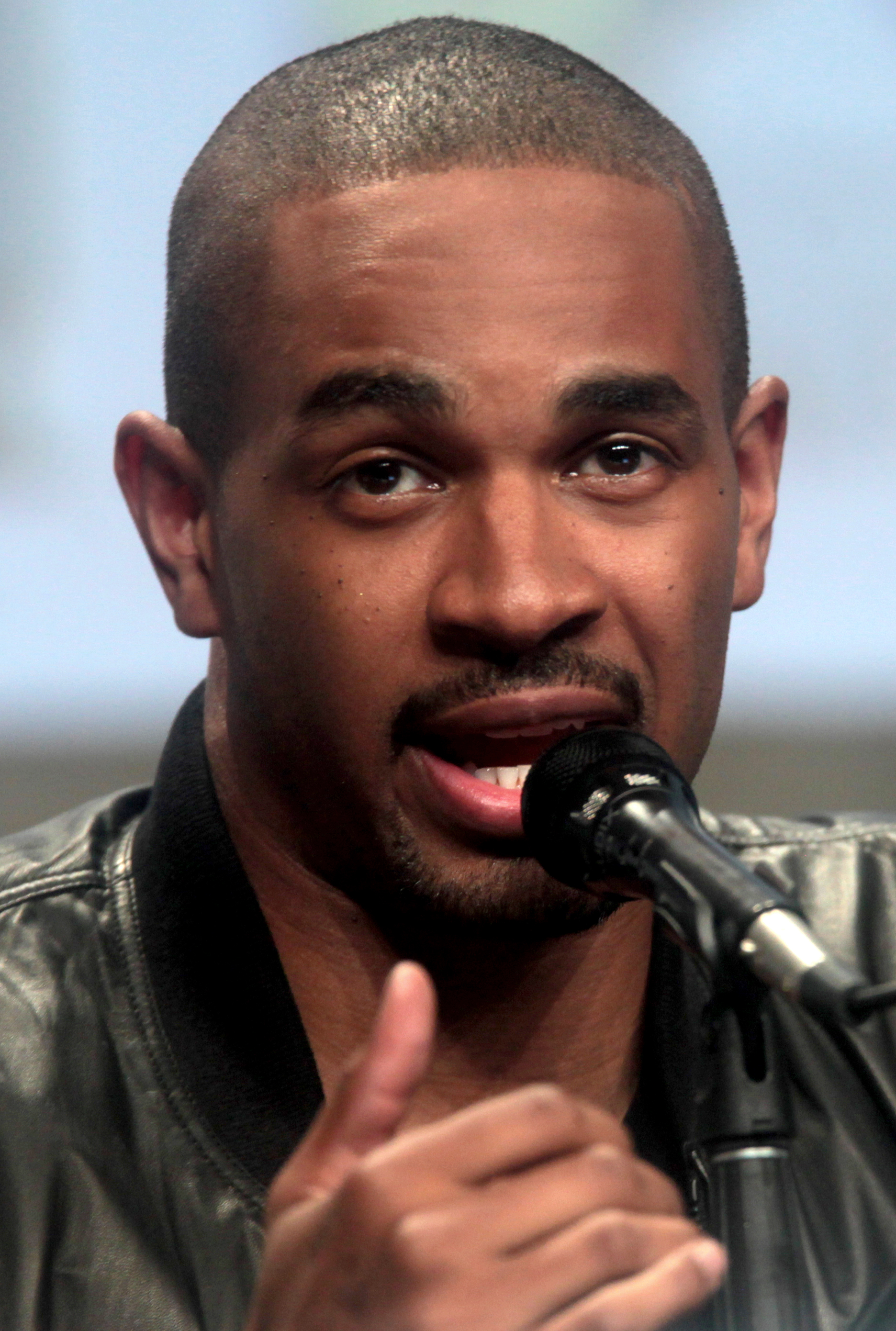
Damon Wayans Jr.

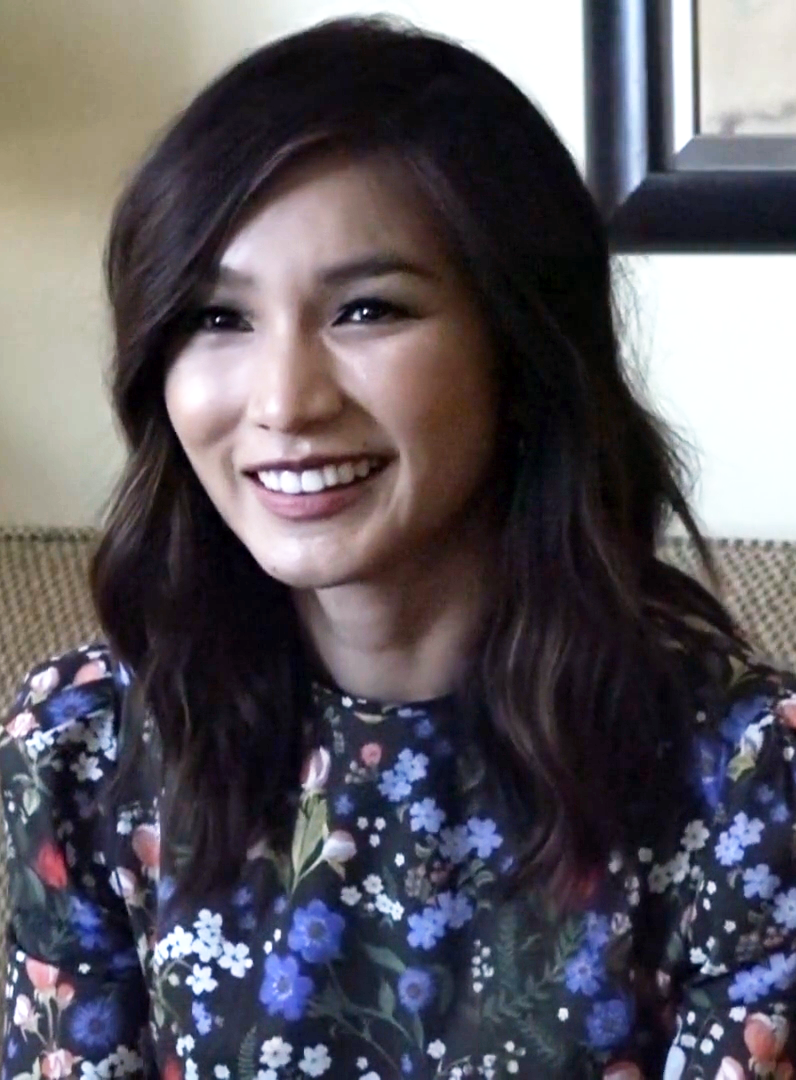
Gemma Chan

- November 2 – Kyoko Fukada, Japanese actress and singer
- November 3
  - Pekka Rinne, Finnish ice hockey goaltender
- November 4 – Kamila Skolimowska, Polish hammer thrower (d. 2009)
  - Evgeni Plushenko, Russian figure skater
- November 8
  - Ted DiBiase, American professional wrestler and actor
  - Francesco Molinari, Italian golfer
- November 9
  - Derek Muller, Australian-Canadian science communicator and filmmaker
  - Jana Pittman, Australian athlete
- November 10 – Ruth Lorenzo, Spanish singer and composer
- November 12 – Anne Hathaway, American actress
- November 13 – Kumi Koda, Japanese singer
- November 16 – Amar'e Stoudemire, American professional basketball player
- November 18
  - Marlène Schiappa, French politician
  - Damon Wayans, Jr., American actor and comedian
- November 19 – Shin Dong-hyuk, North Korean defector and human rights activist
- November 21
  - Ioana Ciolacu, Romanian fashion designer
  - Nadia Buari, Ghana Movie Actress
- November 22
  - Steve Angello, Greek-Swedish DJ and producer
  - Charlene Choi, Hong Kong singer and actress
- November 23 – Asafa Powell, Jamaican sprinter
- November 24 – Mary Kom, Indian boxer
- November 25 – Minna Kauppi, Finnish orienteer
- November 27 – Aleksandr Kerzhakov, Russian soccer player
- November 28 – Steve Mullings, Jamaican athlete
- November 29
  - Lucas Black, American actor
  - Gemma Chan, British film actress
  - John Mensah, Ghanaian footballer
- November 30 – Elisha Cuthbert, Canadian actress

== December ==
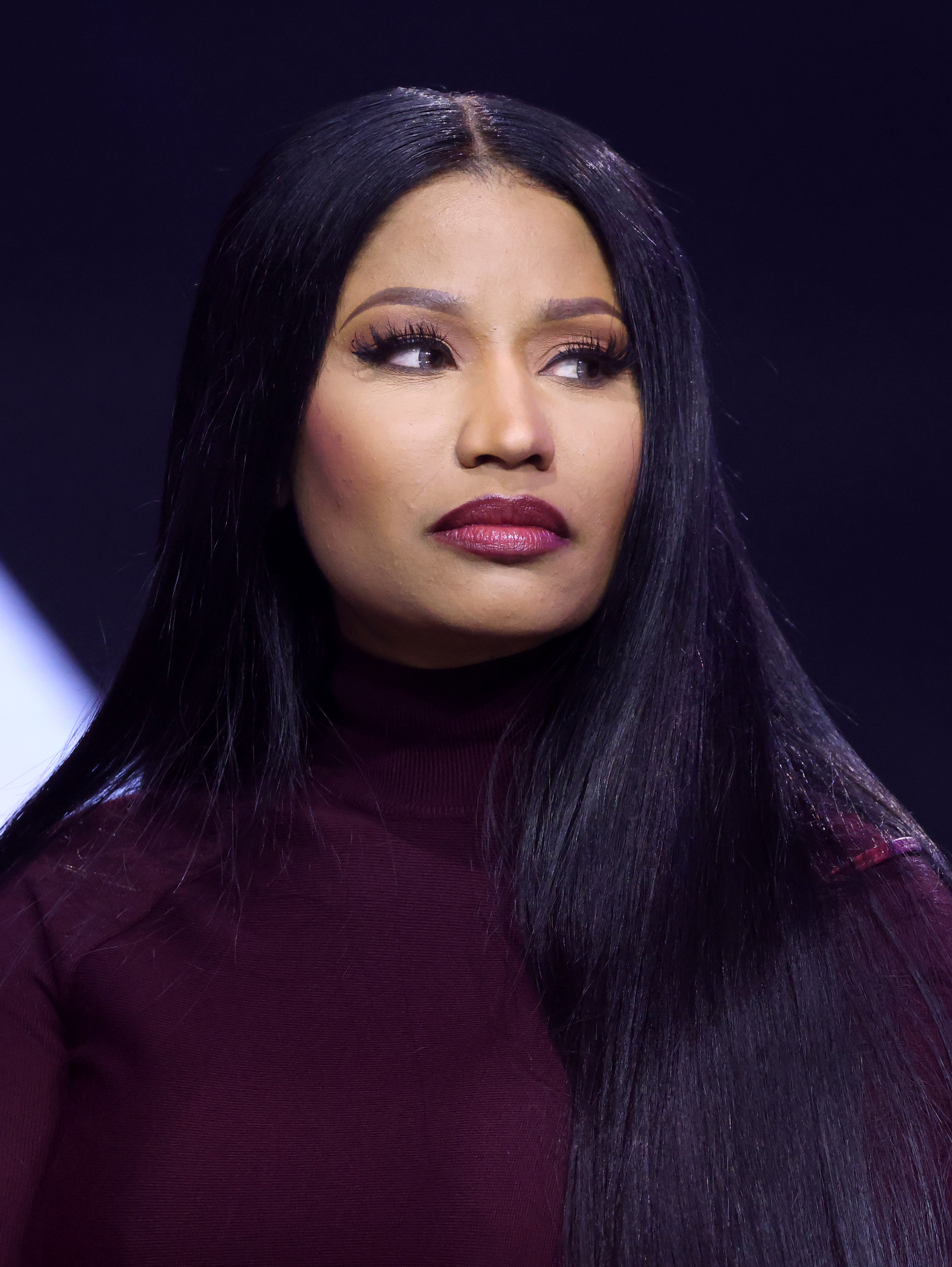
Nicki Minaj

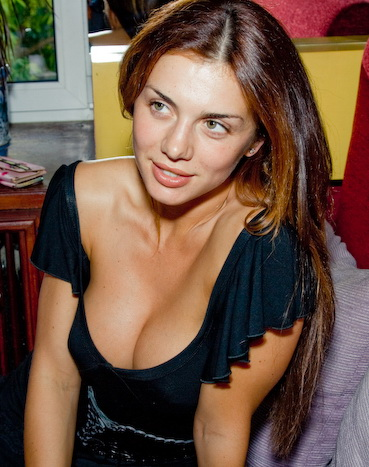
Anna Sedokova

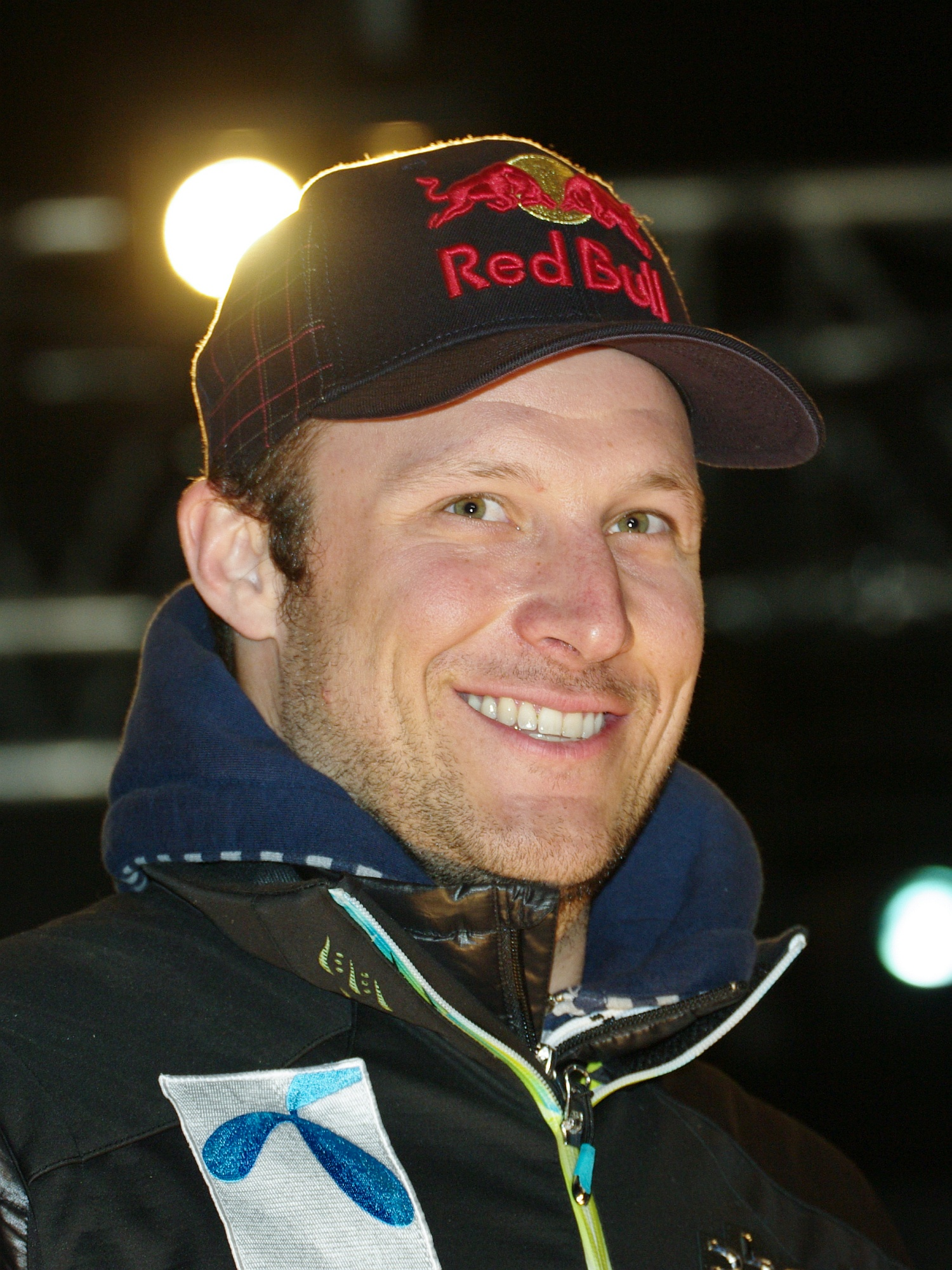
Aksel Lund Svindal

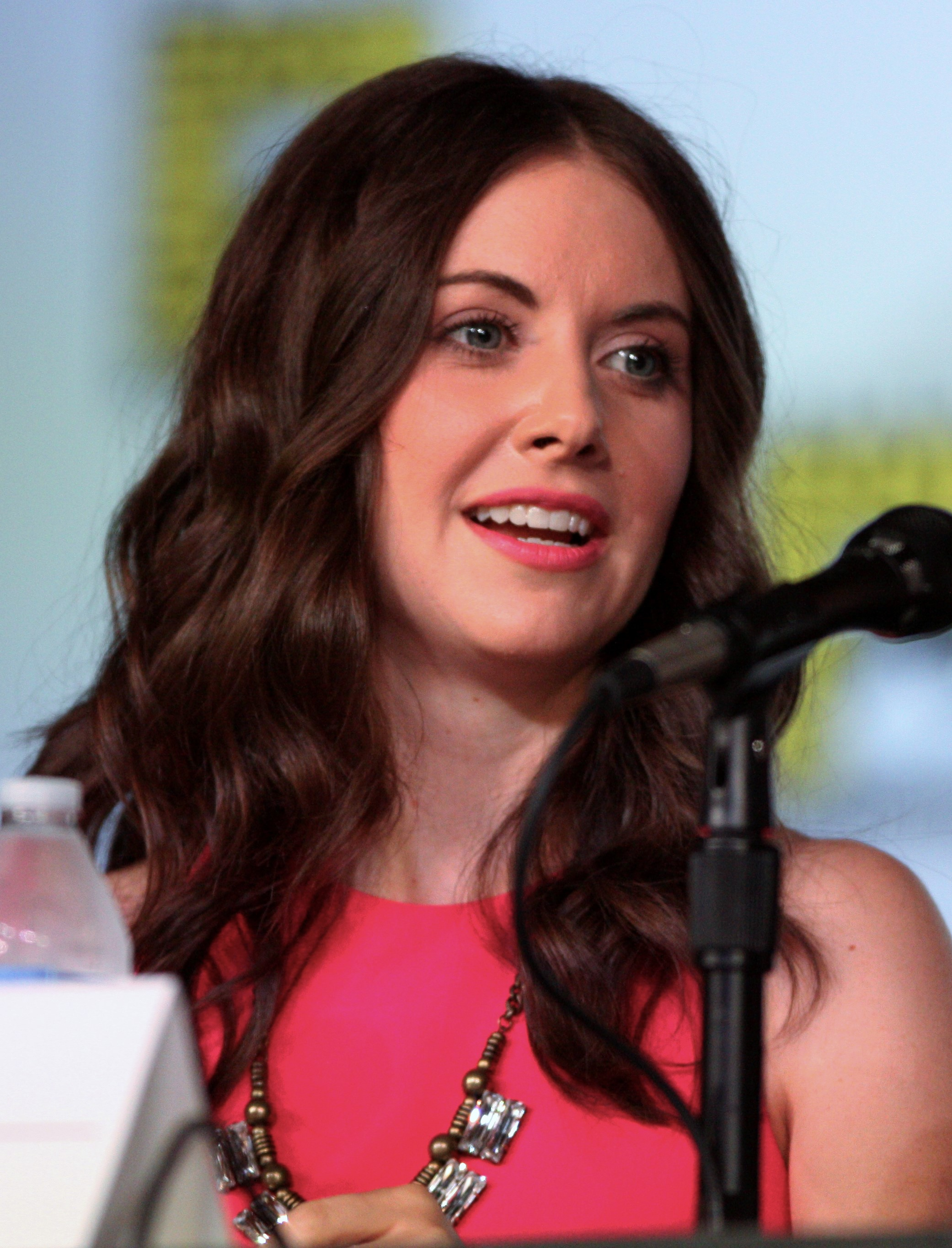
Alison Brie

- December 1 – Riz Ahmed, British actor, rapper, and activist
- December 3 – Michael Essien, Ghanaian footballer
- December 5
  - Keri Hilson, American R&B singer
  - Gabriel Luna, American actor
  - Ján Mucha, Slovak footballer
- December 6 – Alberto Contador, Spanish cyclist
- December 8
  - Halil Altıntop, German born-Turkish footballer
  - Hamit Altıntop, German born-Turkish footballer
  - Nicki Minaj, American rapper and singer
- December 9
  - Tamilla Abassova, Russian cyclist
  - Nathalie De Vos, Belgian athlete
- December 13 – Elisa Di Francisca, Italian fencer
- December 15 – Charlie Cox, English actor
- December 16
  - Anna Sedokova, Ukrainian singer, actress and television presenter
  - Stanislav Šesták, Slovak footballer
- December 17 – Dynamo, British magician
- December 19 – Tero Pitkämäki, Finnish javelin thrower
- December 21
  - Mandy Wong, Hong Kong actress
  - Tom Payne, English actor
- December 22
  - Agbani Darego, Nigerian model and beauty queen
  - Britta Heidemann, German fencer
- December 26 – Aksel Lund Svindal, Norwegian alpine skier
- December 28 – Beau Garrett, American actress and model
- December 29 – Alison Brie, American actress
- December 30 – Kristin Kreuk, Canadian actress

== Date unknown ==
- Katharina Mückstein, Austrian film director
- Ramzi Ben Sliman, French film director
