= April 1982 =

Month of 1982

<<	April 1982					>>
Su	Mo	Tu	We	Th	Fr	Sa
				1	2	3
4	5	6	7	8	9	10
11	12	13	14	15	16	17
18	19	20	21	22	23	24
25	26	27	28	29	30

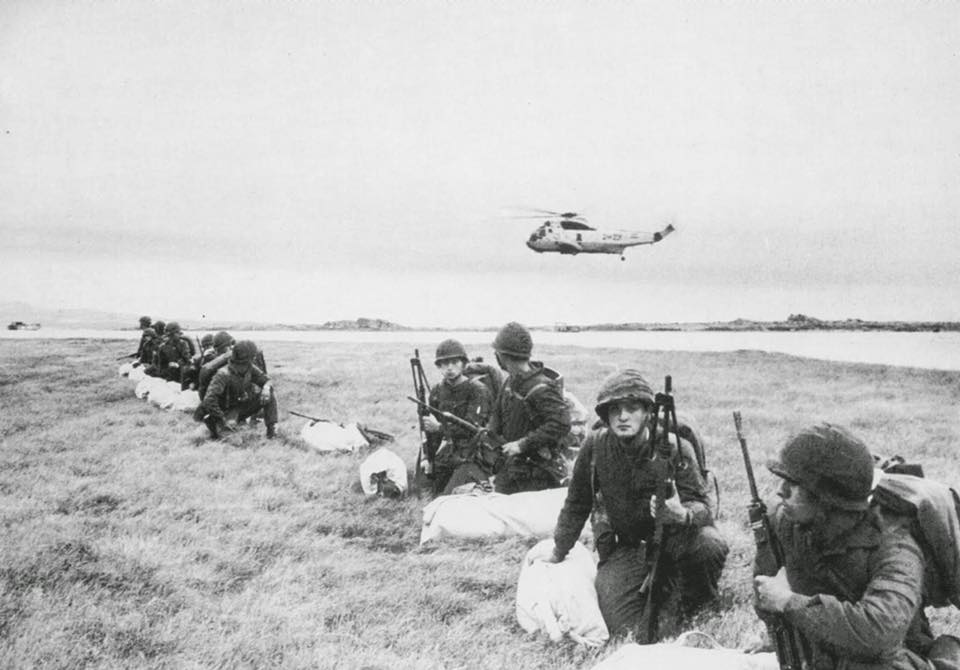
April 2, 1982: Argentine soldiers invade the British-held Falkland Islands and take the capital, Stanley.

The following events occurred in April 1982:

== April 1, 1982 (Thursday) ==
- Former Dominican Republic president Joaquín Balaguer, who had governed the Central American nation from 1960 to 1962, and again from 1968 to 1978, announced that he was withdrawing his candidacy in the May 16 presidential election, despite being the perceived frontrunner. The withdrawal cleared the way for Salvador Jorge Blanco of the Partido Revolucionario Dominicano to be the next president.
- In Stanley, capital of the Falkland Islands, the British governor, Rex Hunt, received a telegram that said "We have apparently reliable evidence that an Argentine task force could be assembling off Stanley at dawn tomorrow." At the same time, the Argentine amphibious warship ARA Cabo San Antonio, the destroyer ARA Santísima Trinidad and the submarine ARA Santa Fe were approaching the island of East Falkland to prepare for the invasion that would take place the next day.
- The night before the invasion, U.S. President Ronald Reagan initiated a phone call to Argentina's President Leopoldo Galtieri at 8:21 Washington time, and talked for 50 minutes in an attempt to persuade the ruling Argentine military junta to call off its plans.
- Born:
  - Andreas Thorkildsen, Norwegian athlete, 2004 and 2008 Olympic gold medalist in the javelin throw; in Kristiansand
  - Róbert Vittek, Slovak footballer with 82 caps for the Slovakia national team; in Bratislava

== April 2, 1982 (Friday) ==
- Combat began on the Falklands between the British Royal Marines and invading Argentine forces at 7:15 in the morning. Outnumbered and outgunned, the Royal Marines withdrew toward the Government House, and at 9:30 a.m., Governor Hunt ordered the surrender.
- In Moscow, a Soviet court sentenced dissident Ivan Kovalyov to five years in a labor camp, to be followed by five more in internal exile, after he was convicted of "producing and distributing anti-Soviet material."
- Born: David Ferrer, Spanish tennis player; in Xabia, Davis Cup gold medalist for Spain in 2008, 2009 and 2011

== April 3, 1982 (Saturday) ==
- British Prime Minister Margaret Thatcher addressed the House of Commons and announced that a Royal Navy task force of at least 35 ships, two-thirds of Britain's naval strength, was on a two-week voyage to the Falklands to liberate the territory from Argentine control. Thatcher told the MPs, "The Falkland Islands and their dependencies remain British territory; no aggression and no invasion can alter that simple fact. It is the Government's object to see the islands are free from occupation," and added, "I stress I cannot foretell what orders the task force will receive as they proceed. That will depend on the situation at the time." On the same day, Argentina began the invasion of South Georgia after having captured East Falkland the day before.
- The El Chichón volcano in Mexico's Chiapas state had its second major eruption in a week, six days after the initial blast on March 28. After tremors that had lasted all day long subsided, the volcano erupted violently at 7:35 p.m. local time. The April 3 eruption was followed by pyroclastic flows of hot liquids, down the sides of the Chichonal mountain, stranding survivors in mountainside villages and preventing rescue teams from reaching them. An even more violent eruption would happen 34 hours later.
- U.S. President Reagan delivered the first of a series of five-minute Saturday radio broadcasts from the White House with the goal of updating the American public on current issues. The first program was delivered live from the White House at 12:05 p.m. Eastern Time.
- Born: Cobie Smulders (stage name for Jacoba Francisca Smulders), Canadian actress known for portraying Robin Scherbatsky in How I Met Your Mother; in Vancouver
- Died:
  - Warren Oates, 53, American film actor, died from a heart attack
  - Stephanie Roper, 22, American murder victim

== April 4, 1982 (Sunday) ==
- Only one week after voters had elected 60 persons to El Salvador's new Constituent Assembly, one of the new members, David Joaquin Quinteros, died from gunshot wounds a few hours after his body was found in the city dump for San Salvador.
- North Korea's President Kim Il Sung was unanimously re-elected by the nation's parliament.
- Born: Pamela Conti, Italian footballer with 90 caps for the women's national team, who later coached the Venezuela women's team (2019-2024) and the India team (2026); in Palermo
- Died: Dzhabar Rasulov, 69, First Secretary of the Communist Party of the Tadzhik SSR since 1961 and the Soviet republic's de facto leader

== April 5, 1982 (Monday) ==
- The El Chichón volcano in Mexico had an even more violent eruption than the one 34 hours earlier on April 3. The eruption struck at 5:33 a.m. and continuing for 45 minutes. with pyroclastic flows of boiling liquids, with water vapor, carbon dioxide, sulfur dioxide and sulfuric acid at a temperature of (750 °C (1,380 °F)) and at at speeds of 95 miles per hour (153 km/h) into mountainside villages that had already been stranded by the April 3 eruption. Hardest hit were the municipalities of Francisco León and Chapultenango. Following the second eruption, a death toll of 5,000 was estimated.
- Led by the aircraft carriers HMS Invincible and HMS Hermes, a fleet of 35 Royal Navy ships departed Portsmouth toward the Falkland Islands, three days after the British territory had been captured by Argentina. Shortly afterward, the British Foreign Secretary, Lord Carrington, resigned from office. Carrington, how had been unaware that the invasion was going to happen until 24 hours before East Falkland was captured, said that he had been responsible for a policy that had led to "a humiliating affront to this country."
- In Pyongyang, North Korea's parliament, the 615-member Supreme People's Assembly convened the first session since the members' elections on February 28. All of the members had been approved for the sole political party, the Democratic Front for the Reunification of Korea (also called the Fatherland Front) and took up the question of "expediting self-reliance and peaceful reunification of the fatherland by securing the guarantee of peace" with South Korea.
- On the U.S. NBC TV network Tom Brokaw and Roger Mudd became co-anchors of the NBC Nightly News, after longtime anchor John Chancellor retired on April 2. On September 5, 1983, Brokaw would become the sole anchor.
- The U.S. Supreme Court issued its decision in the case of Mills v. Habluetzel, with a ruling that a one-year statute of limitations on a paternity determination suit was unconstitutional, in that it denied equal protection of the law to children whose parents were not married to each other.
- Born:
  - Thomas Hitzlsperger, German footballer with 52 caps for the Germany national team; in Munich, West Germany
  - Hayley Atwell, English TV actress; in London
- Died:
  - Abe Fortas, 71, Associate Justice of the U.S. Supreme Court from 1965 to his 1969 resignation amid scandal, died of a ruptured aorta.
  - Bella Bruck, 70, American character actress and comedienne

== April 6, 1982 (Tuesday) ==
- The Carter Center was inaugurated in Atlanta by former U.S. president Jimmy Carter, former first lady Rosalynn Carter, and administrator Paige Alexander. The Center, for which Jimmy Carter would receive the 2002 Nobel Peace Prize is a nongovernmental, nonprofit organization with a goal of advancing human rights worldwide (including funding for election monitoring, conflict mediation and support for democratic institutions) and alleviating human suffering (including campaigns to treat rare tropical disease and eradicating dracunculiasis and treating onchocerciasis, trachoma, lymphatic filariasis, and malaria).
- A retired North Carolina engineer, George Meek, held a press conference in Washington, DC and demonstrated the "Spiricom", an electronic device that made it possible to hold two-way conversations with the spirits of deceased people, including Dr. George Mueller, a scientist who had died in 1967. Meek offered to provide the design specifications to researchers for free. However, nobody was ever known to replicate the results.
- Born: Hong Kwang-ho, South Korean stage and musical actor; in Seoul
- Died:
  - Helen Lawrenson, 74, American socialite and magazine writer for Vanity Fair
  - Al Hoxie, 80, American silent western film star and stuntman of the 1920s, known for Red Blood and Riding Romance (1925), Unseen Enemies and The Road Agent (1926), Rider of the Law and His Last Bullet (1927) before beginning a new career as a police officer after the end of the silent era.

== April 7, 1982 (Wednesday) ==
- The Convention on the Conservation of Antarctic Marine Living Resources, signed on August 1, 1980, entred into force.
- A fire killed seven people and injured two others in the Caldecott Tunnel in California after a gasoline tanker truck struck a stalled automobile and burst into flame. The accident happened shortly after midnight, when traffic was minimal.
- Argentine General Mario Benjamín Menéndez was sworn in as the Governor of the Malvinas, replacing Rex Hunt, who had been Governor of the Falkland Islands before Argentina's invasion.
- The fascist British National Party was founded by far-right political activist John Tyndall and announced at a press conference in Victoria, London
- Born:
  - Julia Hart, American filmmaker
  - Marcelo Jeneci, Brazilian songwriter and singer; in São Paulo
  - Tyron Woodley, American UFC welterweight champion and NCAA wrestling champion; in Ferguson, Missouri
  - Sian Clifford, English television actress; in London
- Died:
  - Koço Uçi, 59, Albanian composer.
  - Stig Lindberg, 65, Swedish ceramic and textile designer

== April 8, 1982 (Thursday) ==
- Israeli chemist Dan Shechtman discovered the icosahedral phase that created the recently identified quasicrystal, a finding that would lead to being awarded the 2011 Nobel Prize in Chemistry.
- Sadegh Ghotbzadeh, who had served as the Foreign Minister of Iran in 1979 and 1980, was arrested along with several army officers and clerics on charges that he was plotting the assassination of the Ayatollah Khomeini. Convicted of treason, he would be executed by firing squad on September 15, 1982.
- In Britain, the 7-member War Cabinet (including Prime Minister Thatcher, Defence Secretary Nott, Foreign Affairs Secretary Francis Pym and Chief of Defence Staff Terence Lewin) voted to remove 30 nuclear bombs that were part of the arsenal of four of the Falklands-bound Royal Navy warships. The Cabinet reversed the decision on April 11 because offloading the bombs was impractical. On May 28, 1982, the War Cabinet directed that the weapons be brought back from the Falklands conflict, and no nuclear weapons were used.
- The John Woo comedy horror film To Hell with the Devil, starring Ricky Hui, had its world premiere in Hong Kong
- Born: Allu Arjun, Indian Telugu cinema star and one of the highest paid actors in Indian film, known for Arya (2004), Pushpa: The Rise (2021) and Pushpa 2: The Rule (2024) in Madras, Tamil Nadu state
- Died: Burt Shevelove, 66, American playwright and lyricist known for Stephen Sondheim's A Funny Thing Happened on the Way to the Forum(1962) and No, No, Nanette (1971)

== April 9, 1982 (Friday) ==
- United Nations Security Council Resolution 503 was approved unanimously by all 15 members after the confirmation by the Supreme Court of South Africa of death sentences against African National Congress members Ncimbithi Johnson Lubisi, Petrus Tsepo Mashigo and Naphtali Manana. The Resolution declared that the world's nations were "Deeply concerned that the carrying out of the death sentences would further aggravate the situation in South Africa," calling upon "the South African authorities to commute the death sentences" and urging all nations "to use their influence and to take urgent measures... to save the lives of the three men." After the resolution was adopted, South Africa commuted the death sentences to life imprisonment. Lubisi, Mashigo and Manana would be released in 1990 after the end of white rule in South Africa.
- Father George Zabelka and Father Jack Morris, two American Jesuit priests, and 11 other people, began the Bethlehem Peace Pilgrimage a west-to-east march, across the United States. It would be followed by a similar march through Europe and the Middle East with a final destination of Bethlehem, in order to draw attention to the proliferation of nuclear weapons and to promote peace. Starting on Good Friday from the U.S. Navy base at Bremerton, Washington, Morris and his group averaged 20 miles walking per day and reached Washington D.C. by November 13. The following year, they flew to Europe for the second phase of their march through 11 nations, and would arrive in Bethlehem on December 24, 1983.
- Born:
  - Rachael McCully, Australian women's basketball player; in Adelaide
  - Jay Baruchel, Canadian fo;, actor, in Ottawa
  - Olimpio Cipriano, Angolan basketball player; in Luanda
- Died:
  - Maximilian Herzberger, 83, German-born American mathematician and physicist known for his development of the superachromat lens
  - Choe Hyon, 74, North Korean Minister of People's Armed Forces
  - R. W. E. (Ralph Waldo Emerson) Jones, 76, African-American educator who was the president of Grambling State University for 41 years, from 1936 to 1977, died of complications from gall bladder surgery.
  - Richard W. O'Neill, 84, American military officer and Medal of Honor recipient for heroism in World War One

== April 10, 1982 (Saturday) ==
- The first of the Indian National Satellite System (INSAT) series of India's geostationary communications satellites, INSAT-1A, was launched from Cape Canaveral in the United States. However, after entering orbit, INSAT-1A had multiple problems and would be deactivated on September 6.
- Died:
  - General Choe Hyon, 74, North Korean military officer celebrated as a Hero of the Republic, Vice-chairman of the North Korean National Defense Commission since 1972 and Minister of People's Armed Forces from 1972 to 1977.
  - Jim Davidson, 79, Australian jazz musician who led the ABC Dance Band in the 1930s and then served in England as a senior executive for the BBC

== April 11, 1982 (Sunday) ==
- A British expedition led by Sir Ranulph Fiennes and Charles R. Burton arrived at the North Pole, less than 16 months after the group had set off northward from the South Pole, which they had reached on December 15, 1980, making the Transglobe Expedition the first to reach both the North Pole and the South Pole. The expedition had departed from Greenwich in the UK on September 2, 1979, and after traveling southward from the North Pole, would return to Greenwich on August 29, 1982, to complete their circumpolar expedition.
- At the Temple Mount, a holy site for Judaism, Christianity and Islam in the Israeli-occupied West Bank, an Israeli soldier, Alan Harry Goodman, invaded the Al-Aqsa Mosque, and began firing an automatic weapon indiscriminately at Palestinian Arabs. Goodman was captured after Israeli policemen and border troops stormed the mosque and captured him.
- Born:
  - Daniela Bascopé (stage name for Daniela Bascopé Van Grieken), American-born Venezuelan TV actress and telenovela star, known for El árbol de Gabriel and Las bandidas; in Texas
  - Remy Ishak (stage name for Mohammad Zalimei bin Ishak), Malaysian TV and film actor; in Malacca City
- Died:
  - Walter Graf, 78, Austrian comparative musicologist
  - Margaret Valiant, 81, American ethnic musicologist

== April 12, 1982 (Monday) ==
- A mob hit man, later identified as Donald Nash, killed Margaret Barbera, who was scheduled to appear as a witness in the criminal trial of her former boss, Irwin Margolies, was shot and killed in a parking garage. Three CBS television network technicians— Leo Kuranuki, Robert Schulze, and Edward Benford— happened to arrive at the garage at the same time that Nash was dragging Barbera's body to his car. Nash, who had rented a parking space next to that of Barbera, murdered his assigned target and the three bystanders with a .22 caliber pistol. Nash was arrested in Kentucky a week later on April 19 and later convicted on four counts of murder.
- With Royal Navy ships on the way to respond to the invasion of the Falklands by Argentina, the United Kingdom announced the declaration of a Maritime Exclusion Zone around the Falkland Islands, with a radius of 200 nautical miles 230 miles (370 km) from the center of the island territory in the South Atlantic ocean. The government declared that "Her Majesty's Government now wishes to make clear that any approach on the part of Argentine warships, including submarines, naval auxiliaries or military aircraft, which could amount to a threat to interfere with the mission of British Forces in the South Atlantic will encounter the appropriate response. All Argentine aircraft, including civil aircraft engaged in surveillance of these British forces, will be regarded as hostile and are liable to be dealt with accordingly."
- Born:
  - Lenny Baker, 37, American stage actor and 1977 Tony Award winner for the Broadway musical I Love My Wife, died from thyroid cancer
  - Vitaly Goryaev, 61, Soviet painter and illustrator

== April 13, 1982 (Tuesday) ==
- All 27 people on a U.S. Air Force C-130H Hercules transport were killed when the mounting on one of its engines failed and a wing broke off. The aircraft was delivering supplies to American personnel at a U.S. based in Erzurum and crashed near Gevenlik.
- UNICAES, the Universidad Católica de El Salvador, was founded in Santa Ana, El Salvador as a private Roman Catholic univesrity.
- Real Madrid defeated Sporting de Gijón, 2 to 1, to win the Copa del Rey, annual soccer football playoff championship of Spain's major league, La Liga.
- Japanese boxer Tadashi Tomori won the WBC junior flyweight world title by defeating defending champion Amado Ursua of Mexico in a 15-round bout at Korakuen Hall in Tokyo. He would lose the title only three months later on July 20 to Panamanian challenger Hilario Zapata.
- Born:
  - Omawumi (stage name for Omawumi Boma Megbele-Yussuf), Nigerian singer and actress; in Warri
  - Ty Dolla Sign (stage name for Tyrone Griffin Jr.), American singer and rap artist; in Los Angeles
  - Federico Crescentini, Sanmarinese footballer; in San Marino (drowned, 2006)
- Died:
  - George Tawengwa, 80, black African Zimbabwean businessman who owned bus companies and hotels in white-minority ruled Rhodesia
  - Georges Villiers, 82, French mining engineer, politician and concentration camp survivor who cofounded the Conseil national du patronat français, the national employers' organization after World War II
  - Betty Blake, 50, American historic preservationist known for saving the riverboat Delta Queen, died from stomach cancer
  - John P. Metras, 73, American college football coach and inductee to the Canadian Football Hall of Fame for his record as coach of the University of Western Ontario

== April 14, 1982 (Wednesday) ==
- A plebiscite was held in Canada's sparsely populated (with less than 40,000 people) Northwest Territories for the first time on the question "Do you think the Northwest Territories should be divided?". Out of 19,000 registered voters, slightly more than 10,000 cast votes, with a majority (5,586 to 4,304) being in favor of the division of the 519,734 square miles (1,346,100 km^{2}) area. With division being favored, the territories' Legislative Assembly would work for the next 17 years on the means of division, with the new entity of Nunavut being separate from the rest of the "NT" in 1999.
- Born:
  - Gabriel Galípolo, Brazilian economist and president of the Central Bank of Brazil since 2025; in São Paulo
  - Silvio Muccino, Italian actor and film director; in Rome
- Died:
  - Arthur Lowe, 66, English TV actor west known for starring in the BBC1 sitcom Dad's Army as "Captain Mainwaring from 1968 to 1977, died several hours after he appeared on live television for an interview on the BBC1 programmed Pebble Mill at One
  - Charles Cushing, 76, American composer and band director

== April 15, 1982 (Thursday) ==
- The Juche Tower, at 560 feet (170 m) a tall monument and the world's tallest granite structure, was inaugurated in North Korea's capital, Pyongyang, in conjunction with celebrations of the 70th birthday of North Korea's Supreme Leader, Kim Il Sung. The tower as constructed with 25,550 blocks of granite, one for each day of the first 70 years of Kim Il Sung's life, and named in honor of his political ideology, Juche.
- In Egypt, Khalid Al-Islambuli, Hussein Abbas, Atta Hemeida and Abdel-Hamid Abdel-Aal, were executed following their convictions for carrying out the assassination of Anwar Sadat, the President of Egypt, on October 6, 1981, and Muhammad Abd al-Salam Faraj was put to death for organizing the plot. Al-Islambuli and Abbas were shot to death by a firing squad, while the civilian convicts (Faraj, Abdel-Aal and Hemeida) were hanged.
- Rock and roll singer and pianist Billy Joel, who was preparing for the production of a new album, The Nylon Curtain, was injured while riding his motorcycle in Huntington Station, New York on Long Island when a car ran a red light and stopped in front of him at the intersection of New York Avenue and West Ninth Street. Joel, who required surgery of a broken wrist and thumb, had to delay recording of the album until 1983.
- Born: Seth Rogen, Canadian television actor and comedian, winner of four Primetime Emmy Awards for The Studio; in Vancouver
- Died: Louis de Guiringaud, 70, who served as France's Minister of Foreign Affairs from 1976 to 1978, committed suicide by shooting.

== April 16, 1982 (Friday) ==
- With Royal Navy warships en route to the Falkland Islands to reclaim the British territory from Argentina, U.S. Secretary of State Alexander Haig began the first of his meetings with Argentina's leaders as part of a plan for "shuttle diplomacy" between Argentina and the UK. Haig met in Buenos Aires with Argentine Foreign Minister Nicanor Costa Méndez. Haig's initial proposal was that a transitional government of both nations, and the U.S. in an independent council, to be set up for the Falklands.
- Born: Gina Carano, American mixed martial artist; in Dallas

== April 17, 1982 (Saturday) ==
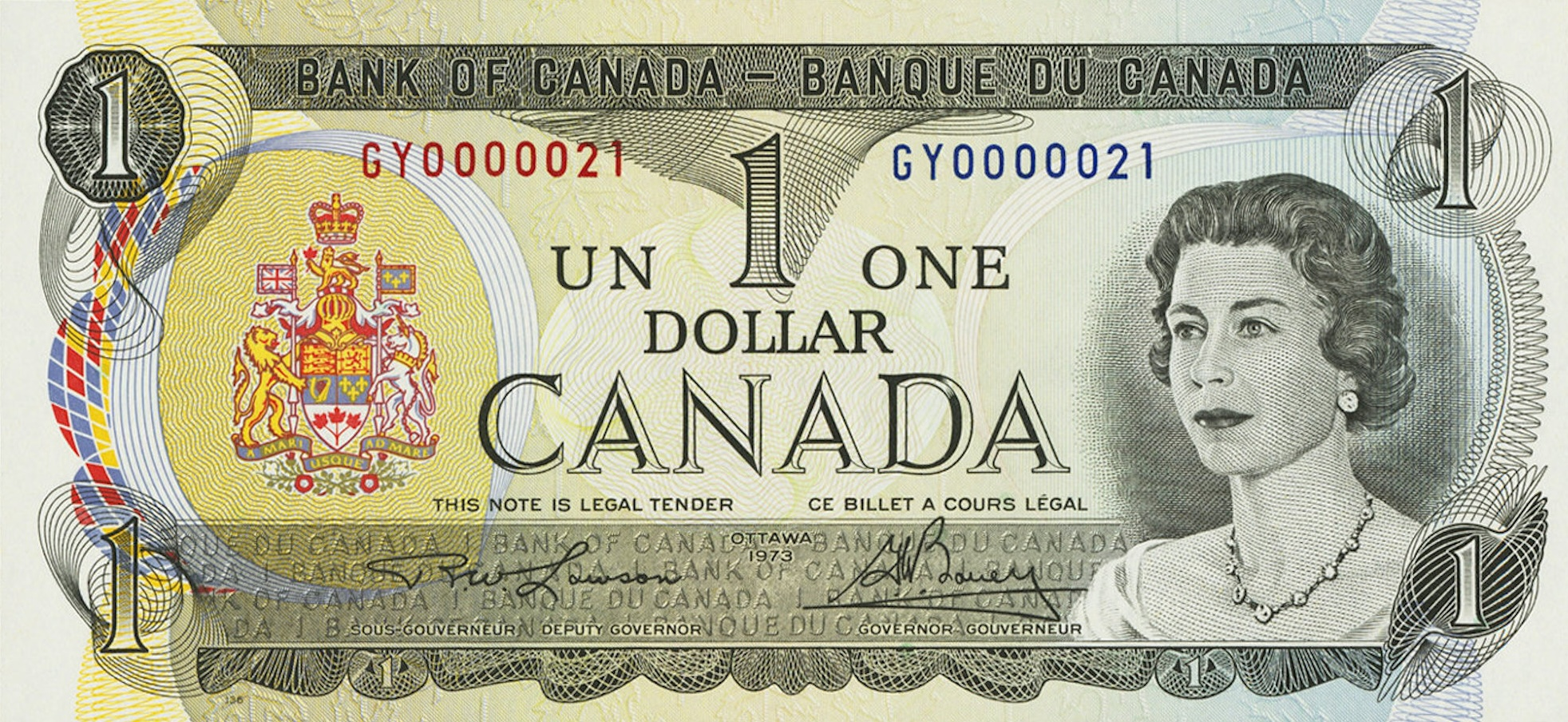
Queen Elizabeth of Canada

- In her capacity as Queen of Canada, Queen Elizabeth II formally recognized the full independence of Canada from the United Kingdom in a ceremony at Parliament Hill in Ottawa, presenting the nation's first entrenched bill of rights.
- Born:
  - Stuart Farrimond, British science writer and specialist in food, known for his The Science of... series of books, as well as a commentator on the BBC show Inside the Factory; in Burton-on-Trent, Staffordshire (died from a brain tumor, 2025)
  - Ding Dang (stage name for Wu Xian), Chinese singer in Taiwan; in Jiaxing, Zhejiang, People's Republic of China

== April 18, 1982 (Sunday) ==
- On the second anniversary of the independence of the Republic of Zimbabwe, which had previously been the white minority nation of Rhodesia, the government implemented the changes of name for 28 cities, with the capital, Salisbury becoming Harare and Fort Victoria renamed Masvingo. Other name changes included Chivhu (formerly Enkeldoorn), Esigodini (Essexvale), Sango (Vila Salazar) and Chegutu (Hartley).
- Robert Runcie, the Archbishop of Canterbury and senior bishop of the Church of England, said in an interview on the ITV (TV network) show London Weekend Television that he hoped the Church of England and the Roman Catholic Church would be unified by the year 2000, adding "I dream of unity with Rome, and with the great Reform tradition and with the Orthodox, by the end of the century, but we will have to get a move on, certainly, if that is our target. I don't see why we should not have that target."
- In Ireland, Kilkenny won the championship of the National Hurling League, defeating Wexford, 2–14 to 1-11, equivalent to 20 to 14 based on 3 points for a goal and 1 point for a score above the crossbar.
- Born:
  - Éric Bernard, French film actor; in Paris
  - Dennis Tobenski, American classical music composer; in Kankakee, Illinois
- Died:
  - Doreen Evans, 65, British race car driver and one of the first women in the sport
  - Hiroshi Oguri, 63, Japanese composer of orchestra symphonies and of operas

== April 19, 1982 (Monday) ==
- The Soviet Union launched the Salyut 7 space station to replace the outmoded Salyut 6, and placed it in orbit 170 miles (270 km) above the Earth.
- The first person conceived with a donation from a participan in the Repository for Germinal Choice, the so-called "Nobel prize sperm bank", was born. The baby girl was not identified by the Repository, which had been created in 1980 by eugencist and businessman Robert Klark Graham. A spokesman for the Repository said that the sperm donor was "an eminent mathematician", and that the baby was "a healthy nine-pound daughter born in April in a rather small town in a sparsely populated state." Before closing down in 1998, the Repository bank would claim to have produced 217 children from donor sperm, and concede that none were conceived from Nobel Prize winning donors.
- The first "abortion pill", Mifepristone, development by the French pharmaceutical company Roussel-Uclaf and later called RU-486, was announced by the company at a press conference in Switzerland at the University of Geneva, which had oversen its testing on 11 women. Gynecologist Etienne-Emile Baulieu reported the development of RU-486 by chemist Georges Teutsch and himself, and the results of the study showing that the pill would dislodge a fertilized egg from the patient's body.
- The U.S. Department of the Treasury announced a reinstatement of the ban against tourist and business travel to Cuba by American citizens. The 1963 ban had been lifted on March 19, 1977, but was reinstated, Treasury Department spokesman John M. Walker said, because "Cuba, with Soviet economic and military support, is increasing its support for armed violence in this hemisphere," adding "In the face of Cuba's increasing attacks on freedom, selfdetermination and democracy, our economic embargo is being tightened."
- The United States Bureau of the Census announced the final result of the 1980 U.S. census, declaring that on April 1, 1982, there were 226,545,805 U.S. residents, or 40,980 more than the initially announced number of 226,504,825.
- Born:
  - Ali Wong, American actress and comedian, and winner of two Primetime Emmy Awards for the 2024 Netflix TV series Beef; in San Francisco
  - Ola Vigen Hattestad, Norwegian skier and 2014 Olympic gold medalist; in Askim
  - Blitz the Ambassador (stage name for Samuel Bazawule), Ghana-born filmmaker, record producer and singer; in Accra
  - Kadir Doğulu, Turkish TV actor; in Mersin

== April 20, 1982 (Tuesday) ==
- Al Neuharth, a publisher who was the manager of the Gannett Corporation's chain of newspapers, announced plans for a national newspaper, USA Today, to begin publication on September 15, starting in the area around Washington D.C.
- Rakhman Nabiyev, the premier of the Soviet Union's Tadzhik SSR, was named the First Secretary of the Communist Party of Tajikistan , the de facto leader of the constituent Soviet republic. Nabiyev, who would later become the president of the nation of Tajikistan replaced the late Dzhabar Rasulov, the previous leader of the Tadzhik Communists, who had died on April 12.
- Born: Guwanç Rejepow, Turkmen footballer with 20 caps for the Turkmenistan national team; in Ashgabat, Turkmen SSR, Soviet Union
- Died:
  - Archibald MacLeish, 89, American poet who also served as the Librarian of Congress from 1939 to 1944
  - Aco Šopov, 58, Yugoslavian Macedonian poet died after a long illness.
  - Roland L. Redmond, 89, president of the Metropolitan Museum of Art from 1947 to 1964

== April 21, 1982 (Wednesday) ==
- American naval architect Steven Callahan was rescued after having been adrift at sea for 76 days in an inflatable life raft. Callahan had not been seen since departing in his sailboat, Napoleon Solo, from El Hierro in the Canary Islands on January 29, with a planned destination of the Caribbean island of Antigua. Seven days into the trip, he was caught in bad weather and a hole was struck in the boat by an unknown object. For almost 11 weeks, he drifted in the Atlantic Ocean until he finally spotted the island of Marie-Galante in the Lesser Antilles near Guadeloupe. Fishermen on the island picked him up offshore. Callahan would later write about his experience in the 1986 bestseller Adrift: Seventy-six Days Lost at Sea.
- The Israeli Air Force carried out an airstrike in Lebanon on villages under the control of the Palestine Liberation Organization, hitting the town of Damour, along with Naameh, Aramun, Saadiyat, Khalde, al-Dawha and Ein Mazbud, killing 23 people. The action followed an incident at Taibe when an Israeli Defense Forces officer was killed by a land mine.
- David Ahenakew, a chief of Canada's Cree tribe, was elected as the national chief of the Assembly of First Nations. He won on the second ballot of a runoff, defeating Secwépemc chief Arthur Manuel, 259 to 50. The election was held at Penticton in British Columbia, and voting was limited to each chief of a recognized First Nation.
- The 90th and final episode of the American CBS sitcom WKRP in Cincinnati was broadcast, closing the show after four season that had started with its premiere on September 18, 1978.
- The Hong Kong martial arts film Five Elements Ninjas, directed by Chang Cheh premiered in Hong Kong.
- Born: Pyotr Fyodorov, Russian film and television star, known for Duelyant (The Duelist) 2016), Ledkolol (The Icebreaker) (2016), The Pilot. A Battle for Survival (2021); in Moscow

== April 22, 1982 (Thursday) ==
- A child trafficking operation in Taiwan as Chu Li-ching and 42 other people were arrested for having bought at least 63 infants, which they then sold to adoptive families in the U.S., Australia, and several European nations. Ms. Chu and her assistant, Jin Shu-hua would be sentenced to life imprisonment, later reduced to six years.
- The first ascent of the 21,239 feet (6,474 m) high Cholatse mountain was made by an American team of climbers (Vern Clevenger, Galen Rowell, John Roskelley, Bill O'Connor and Peter Hackett).
- Elections took place in Malaysia for all 154 seats of the Dewan Rakyat, the lower house of the bicameral Malaysian parliament. The Barisan Nasional alliance of nine political parties, led by Prime Minister Mahathir Mohamad, increased its majority with 132 seats, while two opposition parties, the Democratic Action Party (DAP) and the Islamic Party (PAS) won 9 and 5 seats, respectively.
- In the first counterattack by Britain against Argentina in the Falklands War, members of the Royal Navy's special forces unit, the Special Boat Service landed at Hound Bay to retake the British island of South Georgia, which Argentina claimed as Isla San Pedro. The commandos of D Squadron of the 22nd Special Air Service Regiment, commanded by Cedric Delves, would recapture the South Georgian capital, Grytviken within three weeks without loss of life, after being transported on helicopters from HMS Endurance.
- A car bomb injured 64 people and killed one in Paris, as terrorists targeted the French office of the Lebanese newspaper Al-Watan al-Arabi, which had recently criticized Syria's President Hafez al-Assad. The bomb exploded at 9:02 during the morning rush hour, and had been placed in an Opel car parked on Rue Marbeuf, across the street from the newspaper office, 11 of the wounded were critically injured.
- Soviet leader Leonid Brezhnev made his first public appearance since being hospitalized on March 25 for injuries sustained in an accident. Brezhnev, having lost weight, came to a celebration of Vladimir Lenin's birth anniversary at the Kremlin Palace of Congresses.
- Born: Kaká (Ricardo Izecson dos Santos Leite), Brazilian footballer with 92 caps for the Brazil national team; in Gama, Federal District
- Died: Fred Williams, 55, Australian landscape artist, died from an inoperable cancer.

== April 23, 1982 (Friday) ==
- The city council of Key West, Florida, irritated by a roadblock by the United States Border Patrol of the only two roads that connected the Florida Keys to the U.S. mainland, voted in favor of a resolution declaring the city's secession from U.S. and the creation of the "Conch Republic", a micronation, with Key West mayor Dennis Wardlow designating himself as "prime minister". Following up on the symbolic protest, the "republic" declared war on the U.S., breaking a loaf of bread over the head of a man in a U.S. Navy uniform, surrendering one minute later, and voting to apply for one billion U.S. dollars in foreign aid. The publicity stunt garnered national and international attention to the problem with the border patrol, and created an additional tourist attraction.
- Langshisa Ri, a 21,037 feet (6,412 m) high mountain in the Himalayas, was climbed for the first time, with Takuya Kajimoto of Japan and Pasang Norbu Sherpa of Nepal making the first ascent.
- Born:Kyle Beckerman, American footballer with 58 caps for the U.S. national team; in Crofton, Maryland
- Died:
  - W. C. Townsend, 85, American Christian missionary and linguist known for founding the Wycliffe Bible Translators in 1942 with the goal of providing "for people from every language to understand the Bible and be transformed."
  - Samad Samadianpour, 63, Chief of Iran's Shahrbani police force from 1973 to 1979, and Director of the SAVAK secret police from 1957 to 1959

== April 24, 1982 (Saturday) ==
- The asteroid 3361 Orpheus was discovered by Chilean astronomer Carlos Torres who observed it from Cerro El Roble Astronomical Station, as it came within 0.03145 astronomical units (2,923,460 miles or 4,704,853 km) of Earth. It would make close approaches again on November 21, 2021 and November 19, 2025 at 0.03792 au) and will make its next close approach on November 14, 2029.
- West German singer Nicole Siebert won the Eurovision Song Contest 1982, held at the Harrogate International Centre in Britain. Nicole was one of 18 contestants who had won the Eurovision Contest in her nation, and sang "Ein Bisschen Frieden".
- The University of Bengkulu (UNIB) was established in Indonesia in the Bengkulu province on Sumatra.
- At Belfast, Linfield F.C. defeated Coleraine F.C., 2 to 1, to win the Irish Cup, the soccer football championship tournament of Northern Ireland. Linfield and Coleraine had finished first and third in regular season competition.
- Jane Fonda's Workout, one of the first and best-selling exercise videos, was released as a VHS tape and led to a second career for film actress Jane Fonda as an expert on exercising in the privacy of one's home.
- Born: Kelly Clarkson, American singer known for her best-selling debut singles, "A Moment Like This", and "Stronger (What Doesn't Kill You)"; in Fort Worth, Texas
- Died:
  - Alexey Ekimyan, 55, Soviet Armenian popular song composer and Soviet militia general and detective, died from a heart attack
  - Hassan Tariq, 47, Pakistani film director known for Kaneez (1965), Anjuman (1970), and Umrao Jaan Ada
  - John M. Ashbrook, 53, U.S. Representative for Ohio since 1961, died from gastrointestinal bleeding during his campaign for the U.S. Senate.
  - Sérgio Buarque de Holanda, 79, Brazilian sociologist

== April 25, 1982 (Sunday) ==
- Israel completed its withdrawal from the Sinai Peninsula in accordance with the Egypt–Israel peace treaty of 1979. The lat of the Israeli occupation troops departed across the border without ceremony, completing the process of gradual withdrawal by turning over 7,500 square miles (19,000 km^{2}) and the last one-third of the Sinai without ceremony shortly after sunrise, lowering the Israeli flag at Sharm el Sheik. The troops sang "Hatikva", Israel's national anthem, boarded trucks and buses while two formations of Israeli Kir jet fighters made a final low sweep over the coastline. A few hours later, the Egyptian flag was raised over Sharm el Sheik on the east side of the Red Sea as hundreds of spectators cheered and a police band played the Egyptian national anthem.
- British troops began their assault on South Georgia Island in the first major battle between Britain and Argentina in the Falklands War, attacking at 10:00 in the morning and quickly retook Grytviken, the island's principal port, 22 days after it had been seized by Argentina on April 3.
- An explosion and flash fire killed 34 people, and injured 60, at an antiques exhibition in Italy at Todi, about 75 miles (121 km) northeast of Rome.
- The Soviet Union ice hockey team defeated the Canadian national team, 6 to 4, to win its eighth consecutive world championship
- In Spain, Real Sociedad finished in first place in the kingdom's top-level soccer football league, La Liga, finishing two points ahead (based on a 20- 7- 7 record and 47 points) of F.C. Barcelona (19- 7- 8 and 45 points) and ahead of Real Madrid F.C. (18- 8- 8 and 44 points).
- Died:
  - Boris Andreyev, 67, Soviet Russian film actor known for Two Soldiers (1943) Ballad of Siberia (1948) and The Fall of Berlin (1950).
  - John Cody, 74, Roman Catholic cardinal since 1967 and Archbishop of Chicago since 1965
  - W. R. Burnett, 82, American novelist known for crime novels, including Little Caesar (1930), later adapted to a popular 1931 film of the same name

== April 26, 1982 (Monday) ==
- South Korean policeman Woo Bum-kon began a killing spree in Uiryeong County in South Gyeongsang Province, killing 62 people with several firearms and grenades, before killing himself with a hand grenade. The killing began at 9:30 p.m. when Woo shot a pedestrian in Togok and then three other people in a post office, followed by six people in Apgok, three at a marketplace near Urgye and 15 more at a funeral home in Pyeongchon. Having killed 28 people before midnight, he murdered 34 more the next day. His rampage would remain the deadliest spree shooting in recorded history up until the 2011 Norway attacks.
- All 112 people on CAAC Flight 3303 were killed when the Trident jet crashed into a mountain near the town of Yangshuo as it was approaching a landing in Guilin in the Guangxi Zhuang Autonomous Region. The dead included 53 Chinese passengers and 52 tourists from Hong Kong who were flying from Guangzhou.
- British troops completed the retaking of South Georgia Island in Operation Paraquet in the Falklands War, completing a 24-hour battle at 10:00 in the morning.
- Britain and Europe's first pay cable television channel, Satellite Television Limited, began broadcasting on cable television systems across Europe. It would later be renamed Sky Channel and then Sky One.
- Died:
  - Frank Coppola, 83, Italian-born American mobster
  - J. Linsley Gressitt, 67, American entomologist and founder of the International Journal of Entomology, was killed in the crash of CAAC Flight 3303.
  - Paton Price, 65, American film and stage acting coach

== April 27, 1982 (Tuesday) ==
- Canadian businessman and compulsive gambler Brian Molony was arrested in Atlantic City, New Jersey the day after losing more than one million dollars at the tables of the Caesars Atlantic City casino. Molony was charged with having embezzled 10.2 million dollars from the Canadian Imperial Bank of Commerce (CIBC), where he worked as a loan officer.
- The kidnapping and murder of Frances Slater, an 18-year old convenience store clerk who was also an heiress to the Evinrude family fortune, was carried out by a group of four men in Stuart, Florida. Three suspects— John Bush, Alphonso Cave, and J. B. Parker — were arrested on May 5 and the fourth, Terry Johnson, surrendered to police on the same day. All four would be convicted murder, or being an accessory to murder, with Bush, Cave and Parker sentenced to death, and Johnson sentenced to life imprisonment. Bush would be executed in the electric chair at Florida State Prison in 1996.
- Died: Tom Tully, 73, American film, stage, radio and TV actor known for The Caine Mutiny

== April 28, 1982 (Wednesday) ==
- The U.S. state of Colorado adopted the stegosaurus as the official state fossil after a two-year campaign by a fourth-grade teacher at McElwain Elementary School in Thornton, Colorado, Ruth Sawdo, and her students. A fossil of the extinct dinosaur had been found in Colorado in 1877.
- Born:
  - Koel Mallick, Indian Bengali film actress; in Kolkata
  - Nikki Grahame, English television personality; in Northwood, London (died from complications of eating disorder, 2021)
  - Pablo González Yagüe, Russian-born Spanish journalist and spy as an agent for the GRU Russian intelligence agency; as Pavel Alekseyevich Rubtsov in Moscow
- Died: He Siyuan, 85. Chinese guerrilla leader and educator known for surrendering Beijing, as mayor, to the Chinese Communist army.

== April 29, 1982 (Thursday) ==
- The capital of Sri Lanka was officially changed from Colombo to nearby Notte with the inauguration of the new Parliament Complex.
- El Salvador's constitutional assembly held an election for president, voting for elected Álvaro Magaña as the person to succeed José Napoleón Duarte as the nation's de jure president. The five-member military junta continued to be de facto rulers. Magaña, who defeated Hugo César Barrera, 36 to 17 (with 7 absentions) took office on May 2.
- Died:
  - Jerry Daniels, 40, U.S. CIA Paramilitary Operations Officer, died from asphyxiation from fumes from a faulty water heater.
  - Herbert Collum, 57, East German composer, conductor and organist
  - Elmer Ripley, 90, American basketball coach and inductee to the Basketball Hall of Fame
  - Jimmy Jones, 63, American jazz pianist

== April 30, 1982 (Friday) ==
- The Bijon Setu massacre of 17 people, mostly members of the right-wing religious organization Ananda Marga, took place in broad daylight, at a railway crossing in Bijon Setu in West Bengal. The members of the group had been traveling to a conference at Tiljala in Calcutta.
- Born:
  - Kirsten Dunst, American film actress known for Bring It On (2000), Spider-Man (2002) and its two sequels (2004 and 2007) and Civil War (film) ; in Point Pleasant, New Jersey
  - Lloyd Banks, (stage name for Christopher Charles Lloyd), American hip-hop singer; in Baltimore
- Died: Lester Bangs, 33, American journalist and music critic known for interviewing multiple rock stars for the magazine Rolling Stone and Creem, died of an accidental overdose from a combination of medicines for the flu.
