= May 1982 =

Month of 1982

<<	May 1982					>>
Su	Mo	Tu	We	Th	Fr	Sa
						1
2	3	4	5	6	7	8
9	10	11	12	13	14	15
16	17	18	19	20	21	22
23	24	25	26	27	28	29
30	31

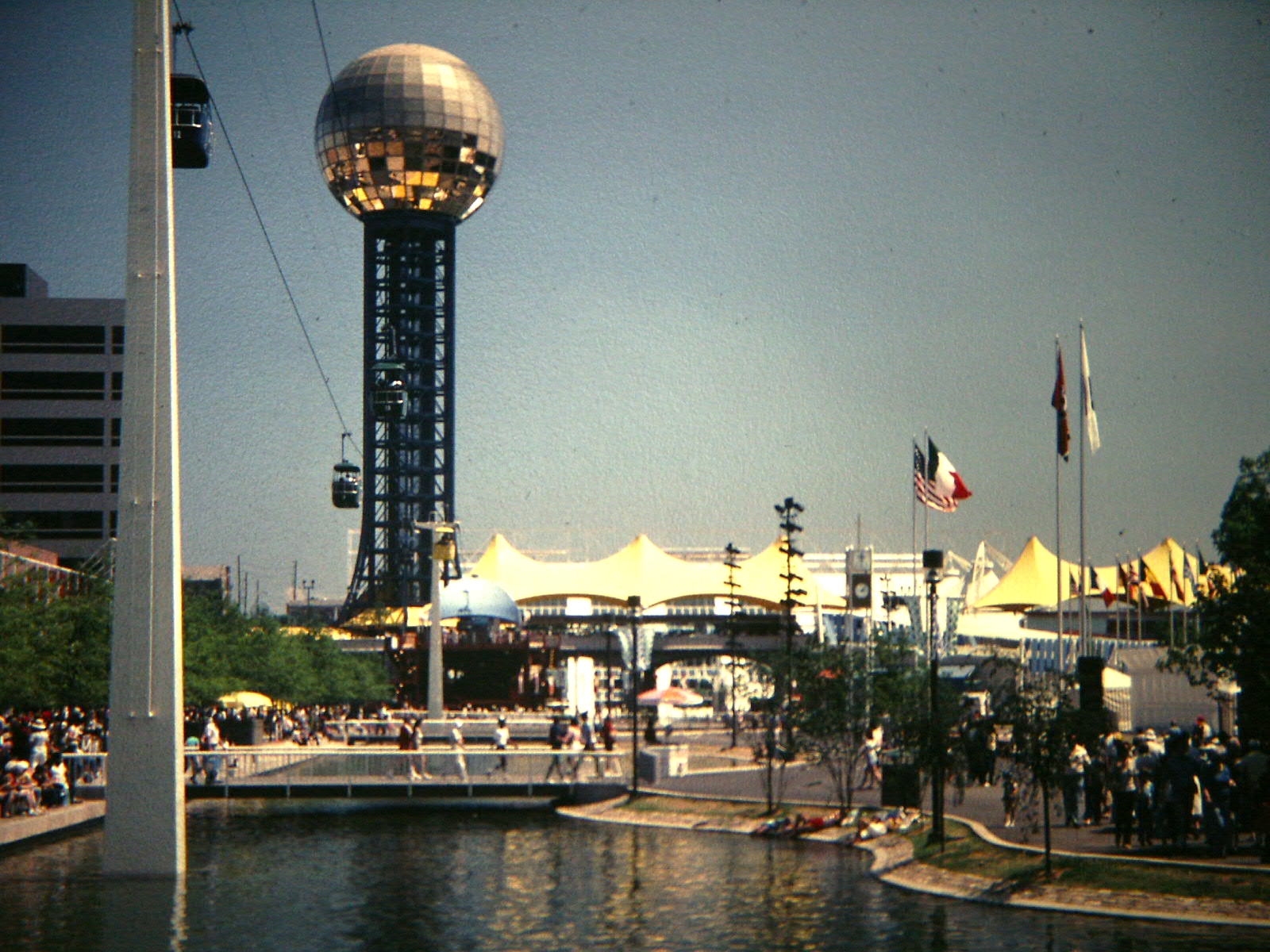
The 1982 World's Fair: its signature structure, the Sunsphere, still stands

The following events occurred in May 1982:

== May 1, 1982 (Saturday) ==
- Italian general Carlo Alberto dalla Chiesa was appointed as prefect for Palermo to combat the violence of the Second Mafia War. Dalla Chiesa, his wife Emanuela Setti Carraro and their escort agent Domenico Russo would be assassinated in Palermo on September 3.
- Falklands War: The Royal Air Force completed Black Buck One, the first mission of Operation Black Buck, bombing the main runway at Port Stanley Airport, which was occupied by the Argentine Air Force. Black Buck One was the longest bombing mission ever attempted up to that time. RAF Flight Lieutenant Martin Withers would later be awarded the Distinguished Flying Cross for his part in the mission.
- Gato Del Sol came up from last place to win the 1982 Kentucky Derby at Churchill Downs. Edwin J. Gregson, Gato Del Sol's trainer, announced that the horse would probably not take part in the 1982 Preakness Stakes on May 15, becoming the first Kentucky Derby winner to skip the Preakness since 1959.
- The opening ceremonies of the 1982 World's Fair in Knoxville, Tennessee included an address by U.S. President Ronald Reagan. About 11 million people would attend the Fair during its 6-month run.
- American television actress Cindy Williams married singer Bill Hudson.
- Born:
  - Ambrose Akinmusire, American avant-garde jazz composer and trumpeter; in Oakland, California
  - Yalçın Ayhan, Turkish footballer; in Istanbul, Turkey
  - Beto (born António Alberto Bastos Pimparel), Portuguese footballer; in Loures, Portugal
  - Andy Dorman, Welsh footballer; in Chester, England
  - Jamie Dornan, Northern Irish actor and model; in Holywood, County Down, Northern Ireland
  - Carson Fagan, Caymanian international footballer
  - Mark Farren, Irish footballer; in Donegal, Ireland (d. 2016)
  - Tommy Robredo, Spanish professional tennis player; in Hostalric, Spain
  - Darijo Srna, Croatian footballer; in Metković, Socialist Republic of Croatia, Socialist Federal Republic of Yugoslavia
  - Katya Zamolodchikova (born Brian Joseph McCook), American drag queen; in Boston, Massachusetts
- Died:
  - Gyula Kertész, 94, Hungarian international footballer
  - Jake Pelkington, 66, American professional basketball player
  - William Primrose CBE, 77, Scottish violist
  - Gene Sheldon, 74, American actor, mime artist and musician
  - Margaret Sheridan, 55, American actress
  - Wolfgang Stammberger, 61, German jurist and politician
  - Vladimir Stenberg, 83, Soviet artist and designer
  - Walther Wenck, 81, German World War II general, traffic collision

== May 2, 1982 (Sunday) ==
- Falklands War:
  - Admiral Jorge Anaya, Commander-in-Chief of the Argentine Navy, put Operation Algeciras, an Argentine plan to destroy a Royal Navy warship in Gibraltar, on hold in the hope of a political settlement to the war.
  - Later the same day, the British nuclear submarine HMS Conqueror sank the Argentine cruiser General Belgrano, killing 323 sailors.
- The Weather Channel aired on cable television in the United States as the first 24-hour all weather network.
- Darrell Waltrip won the 1982 Winston 500 at Alabama International Motor Speedway in Talladega, Alabama. The race was notable for the participation of the driver known as L. W. Wright, a con artist who abandoned his car at Talladega and disappeared after the race.
- 56-year-old Álvaro Magaña was sworn into office as President of El Salvador, restoring civilian rule in the country for the first time since the 1931 Salvadoran coup d'état. U.S. Ambassador Deane R. Hinton attended the inauguration ceremony. Radio Vinceremos, a leftist guerrilla shortwave station, called the new government the "legalization of fascism".
- After the discovery of human remains in a septic tank at the former home of David and Brenda Venables in Kempsey, Worcestershire, England, on July 12, 2019, David Venables would be charged in 2021 with murdering his wife Brenda sometime between May 2 and May 5, 1982.
- Born:
  - Tim Benjamin, Welsh professional and Olympic sprinter
  - Valeria Bilello, Italian actress and model; in Sciacca, Sicily, Italy
  - Johan Botha, South African cricketer; in Johannesburg, Transvaal, South Africa
  - Lázaro Bruzón, Cuban chess grandmaster; in Holguín, Cuba
  - Luigi Castaldo, Italian footballer; in Giugliano in Campania, Italy
  - Iván Cervantes, Spanish motorcycle enduro racer
  - Jamie Dantzscher, American Olympic artistic gymnast; in Canoga Park, Los Angeles, California
  - Fábio Felício, Portuguese footballer; in Faro, Portugal
  - Chiara Gensini, Italian actress; in Rome, Italy
  - Blythe Hartley, Canadian Olympic diver; in Edmonton, Alberta, Canada
  - Csaba Horváth, Slovak footballer; in Bratislava, Czechoslovakia
  - Lorie (born Laure Pester), French singer; in Le Plessis-Bouchard, Val-d'Oise, France
  - Tomáš Mojžíš, Czech professional ice hockey defenceman; in Kolín, Czechoslovakia
- Died:
  - Salomon Bochner, 82, American mathematician
  - Helmut Dantine, 63, Austrian-American actor
  - Hugh Marlowe (born Hugh Herbert Hipple), 71, American actor
  - Bill Sefton, 67, American Olympic pole vaulter
  - Wini Shaw, 75, American actress, dancer and singer
  - Virginia Vestoff, 42, American actress (cancer)

== May 3, 1982 (Monday) ==
- Falklands War: At midnight on May 2/3, while searching for the crew of a downed Argentine Canberra bomber, the patrol vessel ARA Alférez Sobral fired on a Sea King helicopter that had detected her. When the helicopter crew requested assistance, Westland Lynx helicopters from HMS Coventry and HMS Glasgow fired on Alférez Sobral with Sea Skua missiles, killing eight of her crew. Alférez Sobral would be escorted into Puerto Deseado on May 5. The Canberra's crew were never located.
- The New York Times reported that 25% of the NASA budget would be transferred to the United States military.
- William A. O'Neill, the Governor of Connecticut, and Harry Hughes, the Governor of Maryland, signed bills raising the legal drinking age in their respective states. The new legal drinking age in Connecticut was 19, while that in Maryland was 21.
- The American Broadcasting Company launched its All Talk network on two radio stations on the West Coast of the United States.
- In Anchorage, Alaska, seven people were shot to death within an hour in two separate incidents. A woman and two men were killed in a double murder-suicide shooting at a bar, and four teenagers were shot and killed in Russian Jack Springs Park. Charles L. Meach, the killer of the teenagers, had been found not guilty by reason of insanity in a 1973 murder trial and was living at the Alaska Psychiatric Institute at the time of the park killings.
- In a Frank and Ernest comic strip by Bob Thaves, a line about Hollywood actress Ginger Rogers' dance talent was published: "Ginger Rogers did everything he [Fred Astaire] did, ..backwards and in high heels." The quote would eventually become one of the most often repeated descriptions of Rogers in non-fiction publications.
- Born:
  - Juliana Alves, Brazilian actress and model; in Rio de Janeiro, Rio de Janeiro, Brazil
  - Juan Carlos Cacho, Mexican footballer; in Mexico City, Mexico
  - Andrew Durante, New Zealand international footballer; in Sydney, New South Wales, Australia
  - Sebastian Furchner, German professional and Olympic ice hockey player; in Kaufbeuren, Bavaria, West Germany
  - Rebecca Hall, English actress; in London, England
  - Joo Hyun-jung, South Korean Olympic champion archer
  - Casey Laulala, New Zealand rugby union player; in Motoʻotua, Samoa
  - Igor Olshansky, Ukrainian-American National Football League defensive end; in Dnipropetrovsk, Ukrainian Soviet Socialist Republic, Soviet Union
  - Krzysztof Ostrowski, Polish footballer; in Wrocław, Poland
  - Mário da Silva Pedreira Júnior, Brazilian volleyball player; in Rio de Janeiro, Brazil
  - Tobias Rathgeb, German footballer; in Ostfildern, West Germany
  - Nick Stavinoha, Major League Baseball outfielder; in Houston, Texas
  - Irakli Tsirekidze, Georgian Olympic champion judoka
  - R. J. Umberger, National Hockey League center; in Pittsburgh, Pennsylvania
- Died:
  - Mohammed Seddik Benyahia, 50, Algerian politician; killed when his aircraft was shot down on the Iran-Turkey border during a peace mission concerning the Iran–Iraq War.
  - Werner Schwier, 60, German actor and voice actor
  - Henri Tajfel (born Hersz Mordche), 62, Polish social psychologist

== May 4, 1982 (Tuesday) ==
- In the 1982 Indonesian legislative election, the Golkar party retained control of the People's Consultative Assembly.
- The 1982 World Amateur Boxing Championships opened in Munich, West Germany. They would continue through May 15.
- The Vatican announced that Pope John Paul II had named two new bishops in South America. Gerardo Sueldo was named Bishop of Orán, Argentina, and Alberto Jara Franzoy was named Bishop of Chillán, Chile.
- Falklands War:
  - During a journalists' strike, editor Kelvin MacKenzie of the British tabloid The Sun reported the sinking of the General Belgrano with a controversial headline inspired by a chance remark by features editor Wendy Henry: "GOTCHA Our lads sink gunboat and hole cruiser." Over the objections of Rupert Murdoch, owner of The Sun, MacKenzie chose to change the headline to "Did 1,200 Argies drown?" for later editions, but due to the strike hundreds of thousands of copies were printed with the original headline. The following day's Sun headline would read, "ALIVE! Hundreds of Argies saved from Atlantic", downplaying the loss of life in the sinking.
  - The British Type 42 destroyer HMS Sheffield was hit by an Argentine Exocet missile and burned out of control; 20 sailors were killed.
- The Troubles in Derry: 21-year-old Protestant Samuel Caskey, a member of the Royal Ulster Constabulary, was shot and killed during an Irish Republican Army sniper attack on an RUC foot patrol in Derry, Northern Ireland.
- Born:
  - Shaun Bodiford, National Football League wide receiver; in Seattle, Washington
  - Kleopas Giannou, Greek Olympic and professional footballer; in Athens, Attica, Greece
  - Norihito Kobayashi, Japanese Olympic Nordic combined skier; in Kitaakita, Akita Prefecture, Japan
  - Michele di Rocco, Italian Olympic and professional boxer; in Foligno, Province of Perugia, Umbria, Italy
  - Markus Rogan, Austrian Olympic swimmer; in Vienna, Austria
  - Dewarick Spencer, American professional basketball player; in Mobile County, Alabama
  - Georgios Tsiaras, Greek professional basketball player; in Larissa, Greece
  - Nathan Tyson, English footballer; in Reading, Berkshire, England
- Died:
  - Paul Dörflinger, 27, German footballer (colorectal cancer)
  - Orhan Gündüz, Turkish Honorary Consul, assassinated in Somerville, Massachusetts
  - Harry Hays, PC, 72, Canadian politician, member of the Senate of Canada from Alberta
  - Barnett Janner, Baron Janner, 89, British politician, Member of Parliament
  - Guido von Mengden, 85, German Sports officer, Nazi Party official
  - Leo W. O'Brien, 81, American journalist and politician, member of the United States House of Representatives from New York

== May 5, 1982 (Wednesday) ==
- Queen Elizabeth II and Prince Philip officially opened the new outdoor set of the British soap opera Coronation Street.
- The Troubles: 64-year-old Protestant civilian Maureen McCann was stabbed and shot to death during an armed robbery by the Ulster Volunteer Force at her post office in Killinchy, County Down, Northern Ireland.
- A Unabomber bomb exploded in the computer science department at Vanderbilt University; secretary Janet Smith was injured.
- Born:
  - Pawel Abbott, Polish-English footballer; in York, England
  - Ferrie Bodde, Dutch footballer and coach; in Delft, Netherlands
  - Wouter D'Haene, Belgian Olympic sprint canoer; in Kortrijk, West Flanders, Belgium
  - Velibor Đurić, Bosnian footballer; in Vlasenica, Socialist Republic of Bosnia and Herzegovina, SFR Yugoslavia
  - Randall Gay, National Football League cornerback; in Baton Rouge, Louisiana
  - Andreas Haddad, Swedish-Assyrian footballer; in Stockholm, Sweden
  - Gunnar Jeannette, American racing driver; in West Palm Beach, Florida
  - Jia Dandan, Chinese Olympic ice hockey goaltender; in Harbin, Heilongjiang, China
  - Przemysław Kaźmierczak, Polish footballer; in Łęczyca, Poland
  - Corey Parker, Australian rugby league footballer; in Brisbane, Queensland, Australia
  - Daniel Paulista, Brazilian footballer and manager; in Ribeirão Preto, Brazil
  - Teresa Portela, Spanish Olympic sprint canoer; in Cangas, Pontevedra, Spain
  - Jan Rezek, Czech footballer; in Teplice, Czechoslovakia
  - Enrico Rossi, Italian professional road racing cyclist; in Cesena, Emilia-Romagna, Italy
  - Sándor Torghelle, Hungarian footballer; in Budapest, Hungary
  - Adrián Vázquez Lázara, Spanish politician; in Madrid, Spain
  - Burak Yeter, Turkish-Dutch disc jockey, record producer and remixer; in Trabzon, Turkey
- Died:
  - Irmgard Keun, 77, German novelist
  - Cal Tjader, 56, American Latin jazz musician

== May 6, 1982 (Thursday) ==
- Falklands War: Two Sea Harrier FRS1 aircraft disappeared on a combat air patrol mission over the South Atlantic. They were presumed to have experienced a mid-air collision in bad weather, killing both pilots.
- The CBS television network announced its plans for the 1982-83 TV season, which included the cancellations of five series: House Calls, Lou Grant, Mr. Merlin, Nurse and WKRP in Cincinnati. A CBS spokesman said Lou Grant was being canceled "reluctantly" due to low ratings.
- At 20:00:00.08 GMT, at the Nevada Test Site, the United States conducted the Kryddost nuclear test as part of the Operation Praetorian test series.
- Born:
  - Miguel Almazán, Mexican footballer; in Mexico City, Mexico
  - Celeste Barber, Australian comedian and media personality; in Sydney, New South Wales, Australia
  - Semir Ben-Amor, Finnish professional ice hockey forward; in Helsinki, Finland
  - Annagrazia Calabria, Italian politician; in New York City, New York
  - Duri Camichel, Swiss professional ice hockey forward; in Samedan, Switzerland (d. 2015)
  - Dustin Colquitt, National Football League punter; in Knoxville, Tennessee
  - Achmat Hassiem, South African Paralympic swimmer; in Cape Town, Western Cape, South Africa
  - Kirsi Helen (born Kirsi Perälä), Finnish Olympic cross-country skier; in Forssa, Finland
  - Miljan Mrdaković, Serbian Olympic and professional footballer; in Niš, Socialist Republic of Serbia, SFR Yugoslavia (d. 2020)
  - Eric Murray, New Zealand Olympic champion rower; in Hastings, Hawke's Bay Region, New Zealand
  - Dilshod Nazarov, Tajik Olympic champion hammer thrower; in Dushanbe, Tajik Soviet Socialist Republic, Soviet Union
  - Marcel Ndjeng, Cameroonian footballer; in Bonn, West Germany
  - Paulão (born Paulo Afonso Santos Júnior), Brazilian footballer
  - Lindsay Pulsipher, American actress; in Salt Lake City, Utah
  - Ishkhan Saghatelyan, Armenian politician; in Geghamavan, Armenian Soviet Socialist Republic, Soviet Union
  - Kyle Shewfelt, Canadian Olympic champion gymnast; in Calgary, Alberta, Canada
  - Francisco Ventoso, Spanish professional and Olympic road racing cyclist; in Reinosa, Spain
  - Jason Witten, National Football League tight end
- Died:
  - Salvatore Ruggiero, 36, American mobster, in plane crash off the coast of Georgia.
  - Herman T. Schneebeli, 74, member of the United States House of Representatives from Pennsylvania

== May 7, 1982 (Friday) ==
- 27-year-old Filipino boxer Andy Balaba was fatally injured during a fight with Hi-Sup Shin at Changchung Gymnasium in Seoul, South Korea. He would die on May 11.
- A U.S. federal court ruled that the National Football League had violated antitrust laws by preventing the Oakland Raiders from moving to Los Angeles.
- IBM released version 1.1 of PC DOS.
- At 18:17:00.11 GMT, at the Nevada Test Site, the United States conducted the Bouschet nuclear test as part of the Operation Praetorian test series.
- Born:
  - Jay Bothroyd, English footballer; in Islington, London, England
  - Ákos Buzsáky, Hungarian footballer; in Budapest, Hungary
  - Kristjan Fajt, Slovenian racing cyclist; in Koper, Socialist Republic of Slovenia, SFR Yugoslavia
  - Matt Gaetz, member of the United States House of Representatives from Florida; in Hollywood, Florida
  - Gustavinho (born Gustavo Nacarato Veronesi), Brazilian footballer; in Alagoinhas, Brazil
  - Conor Jackson, Major League Baseball first baseman and left fielder; in Austin, Texas
  - Ewelina Kobryn, Polish professional basketball player; in Tarnobrzeg, Poland
  - Renaldo Major, American professional basketball player and coach; in Chicago, Illinois
  - Nam Song-chol, North Korean international footballer; in Pyongyang, North Korea
  - Filip Novák, Czech professional ice hockey defenceman; in České Budějovice, Czechoslovakia
  - Juan Pablo Raponi, Argentine footballer; in Álvarez, Santa Fe, Argentina
  - José Saez, French footballer; in Menen, Belgium
  - Dušan Vasiljević, Serbian footballer; in Belgrade, SR Serbia, SFR Yugoslavia
- Died: Claudio Barrientos, 46, Chilean Olympic boxer

== May 8, 1982 (Saturday) ==
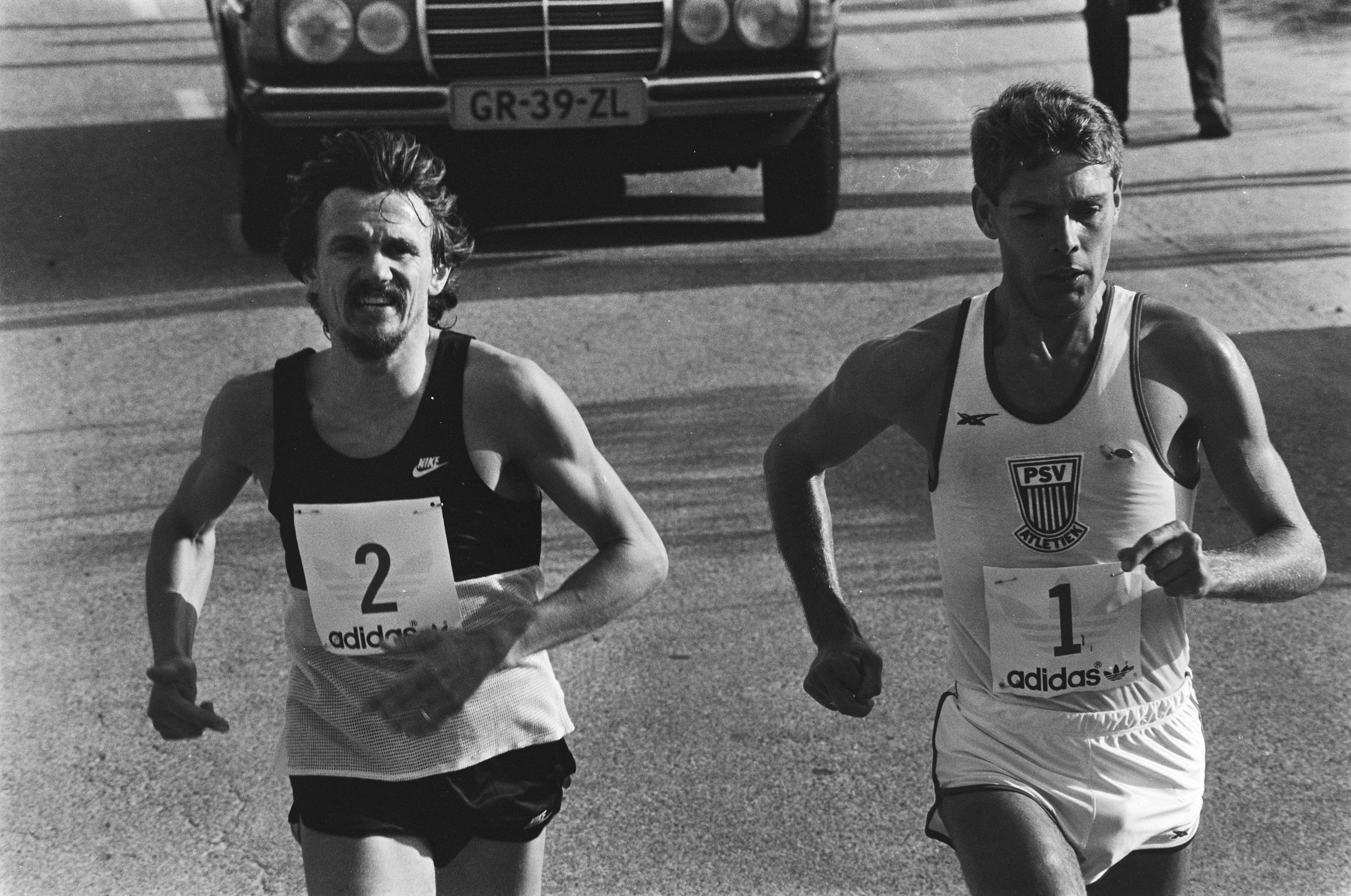
Amsterdam Marathon runners Jose Reveyn (left) and Cor Vriend (right)

- Cor Vriend and Annie van Stiphout won the men's and women's races of the 1982 Amsterdam Marathon.
- Born:
  - Jessica Aguilar, Mexican-American mixed martial artist; in Poza Rica, Veracruz, Mexico
  - Habib Bamogo, Burkinabé footballer; in Paris, France
  - Buakaw Banchamek (born Sombat Banchamek), Thai Muay Thai kickboxer; in Ban Song Nong County, Samrong Thap District, Surin Province, Thailand
  - Christina Cole, English actress; in London, England
  - Aarón Galindo, Mexican footballer; in Mexico City, Mexico
  - Adrián González, Major League Baseball first baseman; in San Diego, California
  - Federico Mancinelli, Argentine footballer; in Bahía Blanca, Argentina
  - Kevin Stefanski, National Football League coach; in Philadelphia, Pennsylvania
  - Uğur Yıldırım, Dutch footballer and coach; in Apeldoorn, Netherlands
  - David van Zanten, Irish footballer; in Dublin, Ireland
- Died:
  - Salomea Andronikova, 93, Georgian-Russian socialite
  - Neil Bogart, 39, American record executive
  - Bernie Glow, 56, American trumpet player
  - Gilles Villeneuve, 32, French-Canadian racing driver; killed during qualifying for the 1982 Belgian Grand Prix.

== May 9, 1982 (Sunday) ==
- The Belgian Grand Prix was run at Circuit Zolder, overshadowed by the death of Gilles Villeneuve the previous day. British driver John Watson of the McLaren-Ford team won the race.
- Hugh Jones and Joyce Smith won the men's and women's races of the 1982 London Marathon. BBC One aired live coverage of the race.
- Falklands War: British Sea Harrier aircraft strafed and bombed the Argentine spy trawler ARA Narwal, killing one crewman and disabling the trawler. Members of the Special Boat Service boarded and captured Narwal. The British Type 42 destroyer HMS Coventry shot down an Argentine Puma AE-505 helicopter on its way to rescue the Narwal's crew, killing all three crewmen; their bodies and the helicopter were lost at sea near Sea Lion Island and never recovered.
- Born:
  - Martin Andersson, Swedish footballer
  - Rachel Boston, American actress; in Signal Mountain, Tennessee
  - Louis Brain, English-Australian footballer; in Birmingham, England
  - Barbara Cabrita, French-Portuguese model and actress; in Trappes, Yvelines, France
  - Javier Casas, Spanish footballer; in Bilbao, Spain
  - Travis Jayner, Canadian-American Olympic short track speed skater; in Moncton, New Brunswick, Canada
  - Kim Jung-woo, South Korean footballer; in Seoul, South Korea
  - Hernán Losada, Argentine footballer and manager; in Buenos Aires, Argentina
  - Édson Uribe, Peruvian footballer; in Lima, Peru
  - Lindsay Whalen, American professional and Olympic champion basketball player and coach; in Hutchinson, Minnesota

== May 10, 1982 (Monday) ==
- Falklands War:
  - HMS Sheffield and ARA Narwal both foundered and sank while under tow.
  - At 10:30 p.m., the Type 21 frigate HMS Alacrity fired on the Argentine Navy supply ship ARA Isla de los Estados, which was carrying a cargo of ammunition and aviation fuel. The Isla de los Estados exploded and sank, killing 22 of the ship's 24 crewmembers. The two survivors would be rescued from the Swan Islands by the ship Forrest, which the Argentines had seized from the Falkland Islands Company.
- Radio station WABC in New York City joined ABC's All Talk network after playing John Lennon's "Imagine" as its last record.
- At a farmhouse in Deerfield, Michigan, 17-year-olds David Ray Cole and Timothy Paul Fowler were locked inside the bathroom and burned to death when gasoline was set ablaze outside the door. As of 2019 the case would remain unsolved.
- Belize became a member of UNESCO.
- Born:
  - Adebayo Akinfenwa, English footballer; in Islington, London, England
  - Juan Pablo Avendaño, Argentine footballer; in Laguna Larga, Córdoba Province, Argentina
  - Evans Cheruiyot, Kenyan marathon runner; in Kapkoi village, Keiyo District, Kenya
  - Petr Čoupek, Czech footballer; in Brno, Czechoslovakia
  - Stefanos Dedas, Greek professional basketball head coach; in Kilkis, Greece
  - Željko Đokić, Serbian-born Bosnian-Herzegovinian footballer; in Novi Sad, SR Serbia, SFR Yugoslavia
  - Eva-Maria Fitze, German Olympic figure skater; in Dachau, Bavaria, West Germany
  - Stephanie Gandy, British-American professional basketball player; in Detroit, Michigan
  - Marc Hennerici, German racing driver; in Mayen, West Germany
  - Vittorio Iannuzzo, Italian motorcycle racer; in Avellino, Italy
  - Bekir Karayel, Turkish Olympic marathon runner; in Sungurlu, Çorum Province, Turkey
  - Alan Keely, Irish footballer; in Dublin, Ireland (d. 2021)
  - Farid Mansurov, Azerbaijani Olympic champion Greco-Roman wrestler; in Dmanisi, Georgian Soviet Socialist Republic, Soviet Union
  - Sabrina Richter (born Sabrina Neukamp), German Olympic handball player; in Hagen, North Rhine-Westphalia, West Germany
  - Daniel Sereinig, Swiss footballer; in Wil, Switzerland
  - Giuseppe Soleri (born Giuseppe Saccà), Italian television actor; in Rome, Italy
- Died:
  - Ma Yinchu, 99, Chinese economist and demographer
  - Don L. Short, 78, member of the United States House of Representatives from North Dakota
  - Friedrich Schröder Sonnenstern (born Friedrich Schröder), 89, German outsider artist and painter
  - Peter Weiss, 65, German writer and artist

== May 11, 1982 (Tuesday) ==
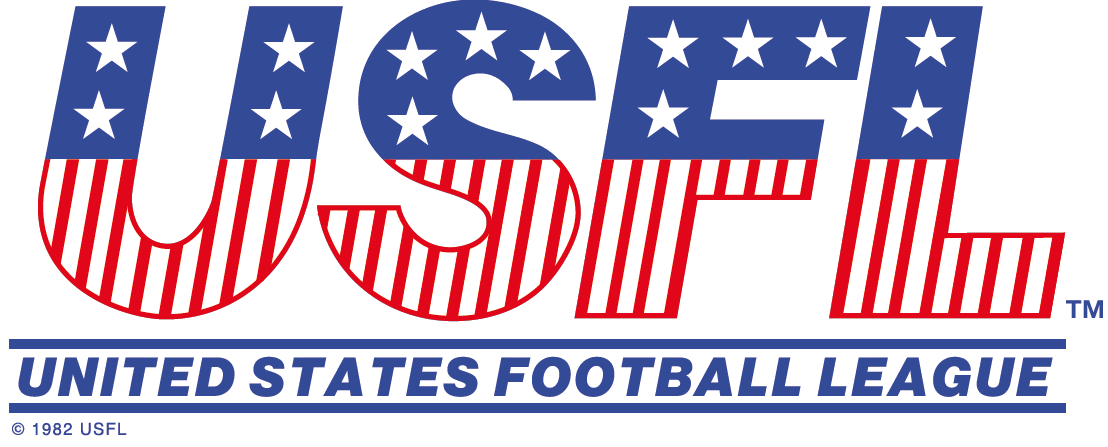
Logo of the United States Football League

- The United States Football League, founded by American businessman David Dixon, announced its formation at the 21 Club in New York City.

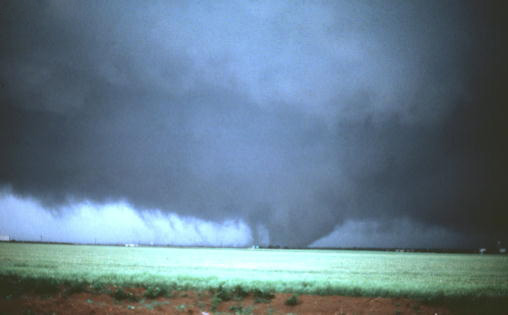
Tornado in Altus, Oklahoma

- Tornadoes in the area of Altus, Friendship and Blair, Oklahoma killed a child and a woman and caused extensive damage and injuries.
- Born:
  - Manuel Coppola, Italian footballer; in Rome, Italy
  - Mauro Facci, Italian professional road bicycle racer; in Vicenza, Veneto, Italy
  - Viktor Gjyla, Albanian footballer
  - Jonathan Jackson, American actor, musician and author; in Orlando, Florida
  - Davide Matteini, Italian footballer; in Livorno, Italy
  - Cory Monteith, Canadian actor; in Calgary, Alberta, Canada (d. 2013)
  - Yevhen Neplyakh, Ukrainian footballer; in Dnipropetrovsk, Ukrainian SSR, Soviet Union
  - Janne Pesonen, Finnish professional ice hockey winger; in Suomussalmi, Finland
  - Andrew Walter, American businessman, National Football League quarterback
- Died:
  - Åke Andersson, 63, Swedish footballer and manager, bandy player and Olympic ice hockey player
  - Mario Marino, 68, Italian World War II sailor and underwater diver
  - Arend Schoemaker, 70, Dutch footballer

== May 12, 1982 (Wednesday) ==
- Spanish priest Juan María Fernández y Krohn tried to stab Pope John Paul II with a bayonet during the latter's pilgrimage to the shrine at Fátima, Portugal, but was overpowered by security guards.

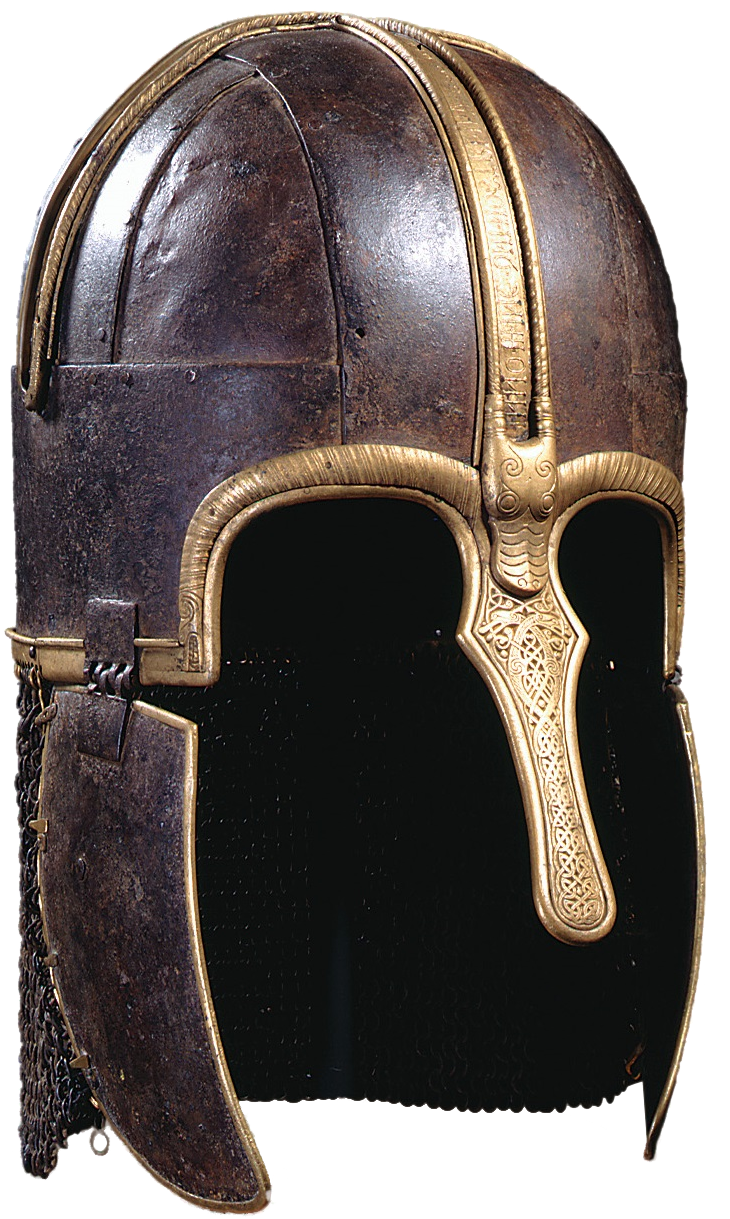
The Coppergate Helmet

- Machine operator Andy Shaw and foreman Chris Wade discovered the Coppergate Helmet during excavations for the construction of the Jorvik Viking Centre in York, North Yorkshire, England.
- Falklands War: The ocean liner Queen Elizabeth 2 set sail from Southampton, carrying the 5th Infantry Brigade to the South Atlantic.
- The Troubles: 26-year-old Catholic civilian Francis Toner was shot and killed during a Loyalist attack on a shop in the Antrim Road, New Lodge, Belfast, Northern Ireland. On the same day, 23-year-old Protestant Thomas Cunningham, a former member of the Ulster Defence Regiment, was shot to death by the Irish Republican Army while repairing a house in Strabane, County Tyrone, Northern Ireland.
- The Pulitzer Prize for Fiction was awarded to American author John Updike for his novel, Rabbit Is Rich.
- Braniff International Airways was declared bankrupt and ceased all flights.
- Born:
  - Maman Abdurrahman, Indonesian footballer; in Jakarta, Indonesia
  - Mobolaji Akiode, American-born Nigerian Olympic basketball player; in Maplewood, New Jersey
  - Marvin Anderson, Jamaican Olympic sprinter; in Trelawny Parish, Jamaica
  - Harry Ellis, English rugby union player; in Wigston, Leicestershire, England
  - Sebastian Hoeneß, German footballer and coach; in Munich, West Germany
  - Akihiro Hyodo, Japanese footballer; in Shiroi, Chiba Prefecture, Japan
  - Tom Reichelt, German Olympic cross-country skier; in Marienberg, Saxony, East Germany
  - Anastasia Rodionova, Russian-born Australian professional and Olympic tennis player; in Tambov, Russian SFSR, Soviet Union
  - Dan Taylor, American shot putter
  - Cosmin Vâtcă, Romanian footballer; in Turda, Romania
  - Rhian Wilkinson, Canadian professional and Olympic soccer player; in Pointe-Claire, Quebec, Canada
- Died:
  - Walter Boas FAA, 78, German-Australian metallurgist
  - James Dempsey, 65, Scottish Labour Party politician and Member of Parliament
  - Hardy Cross Dillard, 79, American jurist, judge of the International Court of Justice
  - Carmine Rocco, 70, Italian Catholic archbishop
  - Humphrey Searle, 66, English composer

== May 13, 1982 (Thursday) ==
- The 1982 Trampoline World Championships began in Bozeman, Montana. They would run through May 15.
- Terri Utley won the Miss USA 1982 pageant in Biloxi, Mississippi.
- In separate incidents, the fishing vessels Humdinger and Sentinel both sank in Alaskan waters. All crew members were rescued.
- Born:
  - Kevin Begois, Belgian footballer and coach; in Antwerp, Belgium
  - Choi Young-rae, South Korean Olympic sport shooter; in Danyang County, North Chungcheong Province, South Korea
  - Albert Crusat, Spanish footballer; in Barcelona, Spain
  - Larry Fonacier, Filipino professional basketball player; in Quezon City, Philippines
  - Mohd Ivan Yusoff, Malaysian international footballer; in Cheras, Kuala Lumpur, Malaysia
  - Paul James, Welsh international rugby union player; in Neath, Wales
  - Laurie Koehn, American professional basketball player and coach
  - Amine Laâlou, Moroccan Olympic middle-distance runner; in Salé, Morocco
  - Donnie Nietes, Filipino professional boxer; in Murcia, Negros Occidental, Philippines
  - Onyekachi Okonkwo, Nigerian footballer; in Aba, Abia, Nigeria
  - Oguchi Onyewu, American soccer player; in Washington, D.C.
  - Casey Stoney, English Olympic and professional footballer and manager; in Basildon, Essex, England
  - Igor Turchin, Russian Olympic fencer; in Saratov, Saratov Oblast, Russian SFSR, Soviet Union
  - Mika Vukona, New Zealand professional basketball player; in Suva, Fiji
  - Maarten Wynants, Belgian professional road bicycle racer; in Hasselt, Limburg, Belgium
- Died:
  - Akhsarbek Abaev, 58, Ossetian Red Army sergeant, Hero of the Soviet Union
  - Gara Garayev, 64, Soviet Azerbaijani composer
  - Renzo Rossellini, 74, Italian composer
  - Billy Steel, 59, Scottish footballer
  - Věra Suková (born Věra Pužejová), 50, Czech tennis player

== May 14, 1982 (Friday) ==
- Falklands War: 45 British Special Air Service (SAS) troops, supported by naval artillery, raided the airfield on Pebble Island, destroying 11 Argentine aircraft.
- Born:
  - Alana Beard, American professional basketball player; in Shreveport, Louisiana
  - Beardyman (born Darren Alexander Foreman), British beatboxer, musician and comedian; in Stanmore, North London, England
  - Micol Cattaneo, Italian bobsledder and Olympic track and field athlete; in Como, Province of Como, Italy
  - Anders Eggert, Danish professional and Olympic handball player; in Aarhus, Denmark
  - Anvar Gafurov, Uzbekistani footballer; in Samarkand, Uzbek Soviet Socialist Republic, Soviet Union
  - Nacho González, Uruguayan footballer; in Montevideo, Uruguay
  - Anjelah Johnson, American actress and comedian; in San Jose, California
  - Albert Miralles, Spanish professional basketball player; in Badalona, Spain
  - Sílvia Cristina Rocha, Brazilian Olympic basketball player; in São Paulo, São Paulo, Brazil
  - Ai Shibata, Japanese Olympic champion swimmer; in Mima, Tokushima, Japan
- Died:
  - Hugh Beaumont, 73, American actor, television director and writer
  - Theodor Thomsen, 78, German Olympic sailor

== May 15, 1982 (Saturday) ==
- The 1982 Tasmanian state election was held.
- Aloma's Ruler won the 1982 Preakness Stakes at Pimlico Race Course in Baltimore, Maryland. Jack Kaenel became the youngest jockey ever to win a Triple Crown race at the age of 16.
- In the city's deadliest fire since at least 1947, ten people, including seven children, were killed in a rowhouse fire at 2781 Tivoly Avenue, near Clifton Park, Baltimore. The fire was started by a candle that fell over and ignited a sofa. The house's electricity had been cut off the previous day due to nonpayment of an $808 bill from Baltimore Gas and Electric.
- The 1982 Trampoline World Championships concluded in Bozeman, Montana. Carl Furrer of the United Kingdom and Ruth Keller of Switzerland were the men's and ladies' champions, respectively.
- Born:
  - Michele Anaclerio, Italian footballer; in Bari, Italy
  - Alexandra Breckenridge, American actress and photographer; in Darien, Connecticut
  - Veronica Campbell Brown, Jamaican Olympic champion track and field athlete; in Clark's Town, Trelawny Parish, Jamaica
  - Segundo Castillo, Ecuadorian footballer; in San Lorenzo, Esmeraldas Province, Ecuador
  - Bradford Cox, American singer-songwriter and musician (Deerhunter); in Marietta, Georgia
  - Anna Floris, Italian tennis player
  - Tatsuya Fujiwara, Japanese actor; in Chichibu, Saitama, Japan
  - Stefan Ishizaki, Swedish footballer; in Stockholm, Sweden
  - Alessandro Panza, Italian politician, Member of the European Parliament; in Domodossola, Italy
  - Alessandro Silva Pereira, Brazilian footballer; in Bragança Paulista, Brazil
  - Rafael Pérez, Dominican Major League Baseball player; in Santo Domingo, Dominican Republic
  - Douglas Simpson, Scottish field hockey player; in Glasgow, Scotland
  - Jessica Sutta, American dancer and singer (The Pussycat Dolls); in Miami, Florida
- Died:
  - Stuart Thomas Butler, 55, Australian nuclear physicist
  - Marty Hoey, 30–31, American mountaineer; climbing fall on Mount Everest.
  - Joëlle Mogensen, 29, French singer (Il était une fois), pulmonary edema.
  - Birch Monroe, 80, American country musician
  - John Newbold, 29, English Grand Prix motorcycle racer; race collision in Coleraine, Northern Ireland, during North West 200.
  - Gordon Smiley, 36, American race car driver; crash at Indianapolis Motor Speedway.

== May 16, 1982 (Sunday) ==
- The New York Islanders swept the Vancouver Canucks in four games to win the 1982 Stanley Cup Finals in ice hockey, their third straight championship.
- Born:
  - Masaki Chugo, Japanese footballer; in Chiba, Chiba Prefecture, Japan
  - Billy Crawford, Filipino-American entertainer; in Manila, Philippines
  - Mounir Diane, Moroccan footballer; in Ouled Abbou, Morocco
  - Jonathan Duncan, New Zealand Olympic swimmer; in Lae, Morobe Province, Papua New Guinea
  - Ju Ji-hoon, South Korean actor and model; in Seoul, South Korea
  - Cyrus Kataron, Kenyan long-distance runner
  - Łukasz Kubot, Polish professional and Olympic tennis player; in Bolesławiec, Poland
  - Hanna Mariën, Belgian Olympic champion track-and-field athlete and Olympic bobsledder; in Herentals, Antwerp Province, Belgium
  - Dan Murray, English footballer; in Cambridge, England
  - Tiya Sircar, American actress
  - Clément Turpin, French football referee; in Paris, France
- Died:
  - Sidney Hickox, A.S.C., 86, American film and television cinematographer
  - Feliciano Peña, 67, Mexican painter and engraver
  - Emili Salut Payà, 63, Catalan trumpeter and composer
  - Leigh Snowden, 52, American actress

== May 17, 1982 (Monday) ==
- At RAF Linton-on-Ouse, the pilot of an RAF Jet Provost T5A aircraft crashed and was killed during a barrel roll while practicing for an aerobatics competition.
- Actor Ed Asner, the president of the Screen Actors Guild and star of the Lou Grant television series, accused the CBS network of cancelling his show for political reasons related to his stances on such issues as the Salvadoran Civil War.
- Born:
  - Kaye Abad, Filipino-American actress; in Easton, Pennsylvania
  - Matt Cassel, National Football League quarterback; in Northridge, Los Angeles, California
  - Abdessamad Chahiri, Moroccan international footballer; in Casablanca, Morocco
  - Clarence Goodson, American soccer player; in Alexandria, Virginia
  - Dan Hardy, English mixed martial artist; in Nottingham, East Midlands, England
  - Adil Karrouchy, Moroccan footballer; in Mohammedia, Morocco
  - Dylan Macallister, Australian footballer and coach
  - Reiko Nakamura, Japanese Olympic swimmer; in Yokohama, Kanagawa Prefecture, Japan
  - Vjosa Osmani, Kosovar jurist and politician, President of Kosovo; in Mitrovica, SR Serbia, SFR Yugoslavia
  - Borja Oubiña, Spanish footballer; in Vigo, Spain
  - Tony Parker, French-American National Basketball Association player; in Bruges, Belgium
  - Agustín Pelletieri, Argentine footballer; in Buenos Aires, Argentina
  - Chloe Smith, British Conservative Party politician; in Ashford, Kent, England
  - Michal Vondrka, Czech professional and Olympic ice hockey forward; in České Budějovice, Czechoslovakia
- Died:
  - Peter Boardman, 31, English mountaineer; died on Mount Everest with Joe Tasker
  - Joe Tasker, 34, English mountaineer; died on Mount Everest with Peter Boardman
  - Dixie Walker, 71, Major League Baseball right fielder

== May 18, 1982 (Tuesday) ==
- Falklands War: The SAS launched Operation Plum Duff, a reconnaissance mission preliminary to Operation Mikado, which was planned to destroy Argentinean Exocet missiles and Super Étendard fighter-bombers at Río Grande, Tierra del Fuego, Argentina. Operation Plum Duff was called off after a Sea King Mark IV helicopter carrying an SAS team landed in Chile, a few kilometers from the Argentinean border, and the aircraft's crew set it on fire after failing to sink it in a lake. Operation Mikado was also subsequently canceled.
- In Cambridge, Massachusetts, Perini Corporation construction foreman John H. "Muggsie" Kelly was killed instantly when a 15-ton crane fell on him during construction of the new Harvard station of the MBTA. A memorial plaque to Kelly would be dedicated in 1985 near Johnston Gate.
- Born:
  - Yannick Bonheur, French Olympic pair skater; in Ivry-sur-Seine, Val-de-Marne, France
  - Jason Brown, Welsh-English footballer; in Bermondsey, London, England
  - Leandro Donizete, Brazilian footballer
  - David Hallberg, American classical ballet dancer; in Rapid City, South Dakota
  - Alexis Kyritsis, Greek professional basketball player; in Athens, Greece
  - Katlego Mashego, South African footballer; in Bushbuckridge, Transvaal, South Africa
  - Marie-Ève Pelletier, Canadian professional tennis player; in Quebec City, Quebec, Canada
  - Asia Vieira, Canadian television actress; in Toronto, Ontario, Canada
  - Roderick Weusthof, Dutch Olympic field hockey player; in Nijmegen, Netherlands
- Died: Frankie Klick, 75, American boxer

== May 19, 1982 (Wednesday) ==
- Italian actress Sophia Loren began serving a 30-day prison sentence in Caserta, Italy, for tax evasion. The Supreme Court of Cassation would clear Loren of the charges in 2013.
- Blue Peter presenter Sarah Greene made a dive on the wreck of the Mary Rose, recovering a deadeye from the ship's rigging.
- Falklands War: A Westland Sea King helicopter carrying SAS troops from HMS Hermes to HMS Intrepid crashed into the sea, killing 22 men; nine men survived. This was the deadliest day for the SAS since World War II. The accident may have been caused by an albatross striking the main rotor.
- Born:
  - Kevin Amankwaah, English semi-professional footballer; in London, England
  - Pål Steffen Andresen, Norwegian footballer; in Lillestrøm, Norway
  - Alessandra Cappa, Italian Olympic swimmer; in Verona, Province of Verona, Italy
  - J. P. Foschi, National Football League tight end; in Queens, New York City, New York
  - Alan Mannus, Northern Irish footballer; in Toronto, Ontario, Canada
  - Roberto Merino, Peruvian footballer; in Chiclayo, Peru
  - Mihiro, a.k.a. Mihiro Taniguchi (born Hiromi Yamase), Japanese actress, singer and writer; in Niigata Prefecture, Japan
  - Klaas Vantornout, Belgian racing cyclist
  - Hiroki Yamada, Japanese Olympic ski jumper; in Iiyama, Nagano, Japan
- Died:
  - Reinhard Karl, 35, German mountaineer, photographer and writer, first German to summit Mount Everest; in avalanche on Cho Oyu.
  - Zoltán Opata, 81, Hungarian Olympic and professional footballer and manager

== May 20, 1982 (Thursday) ==
- Born:
  - Sierra Boggess, American theater actress and singer; in Denver, Colorado
  - Petr Čech, Czech footballer; in Plzeň, Czechoslovakia
  - Lionel Djebi-Zadi, French footballer; in Lyon, France
  - Imran Farhat, Pakistani cricketer; in Lahore, Punjab, Pakistan
  - Ngiendula Filipe, Angolan Olympic basketball player; in Luanda, Angola
  - Morten Giæver, Norwegian footballer; in Alta, Norway
  - David Harvey, Brazilian rugby union player; in Brisbane, Queensland, Australia
  - Wes Hoolahan, Irish footballer; in Dublin, Ireland
  - Lee Ryol-li, Japanese-North Korean professional boxer; in Kadoma, Osaka, Japan
  - Radek Mezlík, Czech footballer; in Třebíč, Czechoslovakia
  - Allan Arenfeldt Olesen, Danish footballer; in Copenhagen, Denmark
  - Ángel Pérez, Puerto Rican volleyball player; in Río Piedras, Puerto Rico
  - Clément Poitrenaud, French rugby union player; in Castres, Tarn, France
  - Jessica Raine (born Jessica Helen Lloyd), English actress; in Eardisley, Herefordshire, England
  - Donald Reignoux, French voice actor
  - Daniel Ribeiro, Brazilian film director, producer and screenwriter; in São Paulo, São Paulo, Brazil
  - Michalis Stamatogiannis, Greek Olympic shot putter; in Athens, Attica, Greece
  - Nicolás Suárez, Chilean footballer; in Santiago, Chile
  - Zhang Chengye, Chinese Olympic biathlete and cross-country skier; in Jilin, China
- Died:
  - Shmuel Mikunis, 78, Israeli politician, member of the Knesset
  - Monk Montgomery (born William Howard Montgomery), 60, American jazz bassist
  - Merle Tuve, 80, American geophysicist and inventor

== May 21, 1982 (Friday) ==
- Falklands War:
  - Operation Sutton: British troops landed at San Carlos Water in the Falkland Islands, beginning the Battle of San Carlos.
  - HMS Ardent was sunk by Argentine aircraft, killing 22 sailors.
- In downtown Scranton, Pennsylvania, electrician Gerald White of Empire Contracting Co. was working near a crane being used on a project to fill in a shaft at the Pinebrook coal mine when the roof of the mine shaft collapsed, swallowing the crane and White. After weeks of unsuccessful rescue efforts, White's body would be discovered on July 2.
- The fishing vessel B J capsized southwest of Cordova, Alaska. The sole crewmember was rescued.
- The musical film Annie, based on the Broadway musical of the same name, was released in theaters.
- Born:
  - Kota Ibushi, Japanese professional wrestler and martial artist; in Aira, Kagoshima (Aira District), Japan
  - Ricardo Lamas, American mixed martial artist; in Chicago, Illinois
  - Helen Langehanenberg, German Olympic dressage rider; in Münster, North Rhine-Westphalia, Germany
  - Jaime Linares, Angolan footballer; in Vila Real, Portugal
  - Ma'a Nonu, New Zealand rugby union player; in Wellington, New Zealand
  - Joel Queirós, Portuguese futsal player; in Porto, Portugal
  - Mike Temwanjera, Zimbabwean footballer; in Harare, Zimbabwe
- Died:
  - Marco Cimatti, 70, Italian Olympic champion cyclist
  - Holger Crafoord, 73, Swedish industrialist
  - Giovanni Muzio, 89, Italian architect
  - Max Stern, 83, American businessman, investor and philanthropist

== May 22, 1982 (Saturday) ==
- In Boston, Massachusetts, CBS affiliate WNAC-TV ceased operations due to its parent company, RKO General, having lost the license. New England Television began operations of WNEV-TV (now independent station WHDH) on channel 7.
- The fishing vessels Camelot and Nasty Habit both sank in a storm southwest of Cordova, Alaska. Camelot crewmember Richard T. Hinde and one crewmember from Nasty Habit were lost.
- Born:
  - Thiago Alves, Brazilian professional tennis player; in São José do Rio Preto, Brazil
  - Atika Bouagaa, German Olympic volleyball player; in Offenburg, Baden-Württemberg, West Germany
  - Hong Yong-jo, North Korean footballer; in Pyongyang, North Korea
  - Marek Kaščák, Slovak footballer; in Bardejov, Czechoslovakia
  - Taras Khtey, Russian Olympic champion men's volleyball player; in Zabuzhzhia, Lviv Oblast, Ukrainian SSR, Soviet Union
  - Kim Mu-yeol, South Korean actor
  - Erin McNaught, Australian model and actress, Miss Universe Australia 2006; in Canberra, Australian Capital Territory, Australia
  - Waleed Mohyaden, Qatari footballer
  - Giorgos Nicolaou, Cypriot footballer; in Paralimni, Cyprus
  - Apolo Ohno, American Olympic champion short track speed skater; in Seattle, Washington
  - Nikolay Pavlov, Ukrainian-Russian volleyball player; in Poltava, Ukrainian SSR, Soviet Union
  - Artur Skowronek, Polish football manager; in Bytom, Poland
  - Candide Thovex, French professional skier, filmmaker and entrepreneur; in Annecy, Haute-Savoie, France
  - Enefiok Udo-Obong, Nigerian Olympic champion sprinter
  - Viktoriya Valyukevich (born Viktoriya Gurova), Russian Olympic triple jumper; in Sochi, Krasnodar Krai, Russian Soviet Federative Socialist Republic, Soviet Union
- Died:
  - T. J. Fowler, 71, American jazz and jump blues musician
  - Hans Mock, 75, Austrian footballer
  - Cevdet Sunay, 83, Turkish army officer and politician, 5th President of Turkey

== May 23, 1982 (Sunday) ==
- Clock-face scheduling was introduced in Switzerland.
- Italian driver Riccardo Patrese of the Brabham-Ford team won the 1982 Monaco Grand Prix.

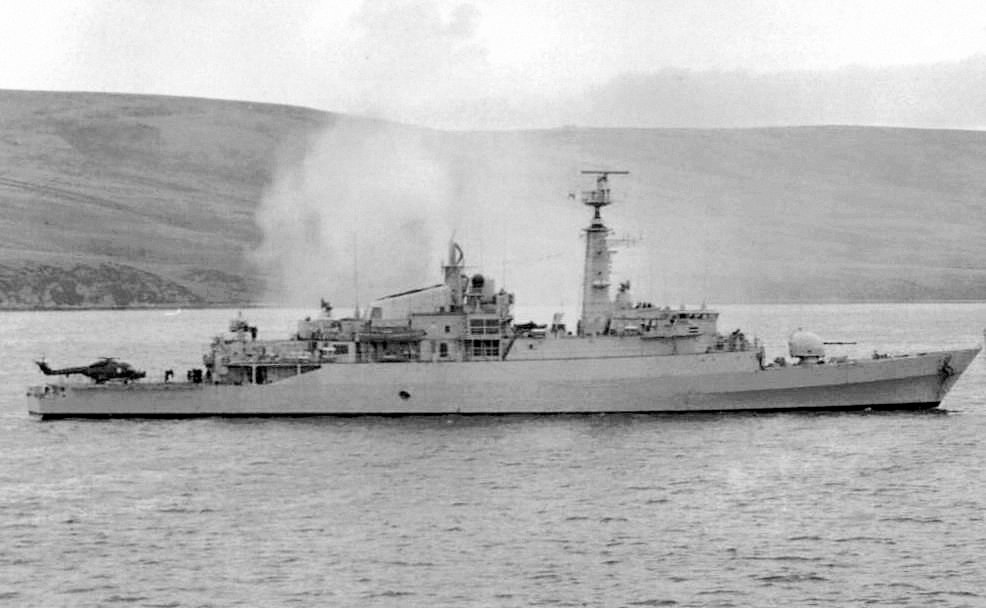
HMS Antelope after bombardment by Argentine aircraft

- Falklands War:
  - The BBC gave warning that the United Kingdom would bomb Argentina.
  - In the Battle of Seal Cove, the Argentine Navy coaster ARA Monsunen avoided capture by British frigates HMS Brilliant and HMS Yarmouth.
  - HMS Antelope exploded after bombardment by Argentine aircraft that killed one sailor and a failed attempt to defuse an unexploded bomb that killed one British Army explosive ordnance disposal technician and injured another. The ship sank the following day.
- Comedian Bob Hope flew in a TA-4J Skyhawk with the United States Navy Blue Angels flight demonstration squadron for the first time at Andrews Air Force Base.
- The newly reconstructed Seven Mile Bridge in the Florida Keys officially opened to traffic.
- Born:
  - Emanuele D'Anna, Italian footballer; in Baiano, Campania, Italy
  - Ali Diab, Syrian footballer; in Hafeir al-Fouqa, Rif Dimashq Governorate, Syria
  - Tristan Prettyman, American singer-songwriter; in Del Mar, California
  - Stevica Ristić, Serbian-Macedonian footballer; in Vršac, SR Serbia, SFR Yugoslavia
  - Adil Shamasdin, Canadian professional tennis player; in Toronto, Ontario, Canada
  - Nikolai Tikhonov, Russian cosmonaut; in Novomoskovsk, Novomoskovsky District, Tula Oblast, Russian SFSR, Soviet Union
  - Remon van de Hare, Dutch professional basketball player; in Amsterdam, Netherlands
  - Endrit Vrapi, Albanian footballer; in Tirana, Albania
- Died:
  - Robert Flacelière, 77, French philologist
  - Karl Fochler, 84, Austrian actor
  - Enzo Galbiati, 85, Italian Fascist politician and soldier
  - Felice Gasperi, 78, Italian Olympic and professional footballer
  - Louis Gérardin, 69, French track cyclist
  - Ove Karlsson, 66, Swedish international footballer

== May 24, 1982 (Monday) ==
- Iran–Iraq War: The Battle of Khorramshahr (1982) concluded with Iranian troops retaking the inland port city of Khorramshahr from Iraqi forces.
- A car bombing killed 12 people at the French Embassy in Beirut, Lebanon. 10 of the victims were Lebanese; two were French. A previously unknown group, the Liberal Nasserite Organization, claimed responsibility.
- KGB Chairman Yuri Andropov was re-appointed to the Secretariat of the Communist Party of the Soviet Union, which he had left 15 years earlier to become head of the KGB.
- The Troubles in Derry: 22-year-old British Army soldier Anthony Anderson was run over and killed by an Army armoured personnel carrier during a petrol bomb attack on the vehicle in Derry.
- The Peanuts special A Charlie Brown Celebration premiered on CBS. Which it includes several stories with one or two-word titles, was later adapted for the Saturday morning series, The Charlie Brown and Snoopy Show, which premiered in 1983.
- Born:
  - Issah Gabriel Ahmed, Ghanaian footballer; in Dawu, Ghana
  - Lusapho April, South African Olympic marathon runner; in Uitenhage, South Africa
  - DaMarcus Beasley, American soccer player; in Fort Wayne, Indiana
  - Víctor Bernárdez, Honduran footballer; in La Ceiba, Honduras
  - Tiago Camilo, Brazilian Olympic judoka; in Tupã, São Paulo, Brazil
  - Damien Chrysostome, Beninese footballer; in Cotonou, Benin
  - Roberto Colautti, Argentine-Israeli footballer; in Córdoba, Argentina
  - Ibrahim Diaky, Ivorian-Emirati footballer; in Abidjan, Ivory Coast
  - Xavier Gil, Andorran footballer; in Andorra la Vella, Andorra
  - Laurent Pionnier, French footballer; in Bagnols-sur-Cèze, France
  - Mohammed Rafi, Indian footballer; in Thrikaripur, Kasaragod district, Kerala, India
  - Rian Wallace, National Football League linebacker; in Pottstown, Pennsylvania
  - Paul Joseph Watson, British right-wing YouTuber and conspiracy theorist; in Sheffield, England
- Died:
  - Raffaele Calabria, 75, Italian Catholic archbishop
  - Stanisława Perzanowska, 83, Polish theater actress and director
  - Zakariyya Kandhlawi, 84, Sunni Hanafi Hadith scholar

== May 25, 1982 (Tuesday) ==
- Falklands War:
  - On Argentina's national day, British ships HMS Coventry and SS Atlantic Conveyor were sunk, Coventry by two Argentine Air Force A-4C Skyhawks and Atlantic Conveyor by two Exocets. 19 sailors died in the loss of Coventry; a 20th sailor died as a result of his injuries the following year. 12 sailors died in the loss of Atlantic Conveyor, including the ship's master, Captain Ian Harry North, who was posthumously awarded the Distinguished Service Cross (DSC).
  - A few weeks after her sinking of the General Belgrano, a jury-rigged floating wire aerial wrapped around HMS Conqueror's propeller, creating cavitation noise which risked detection by Argentine forces. Once the weather permitted, Conqueror surfaced for repairs. Acting Petty Officer (Sonar) Graham Libby made a hazardous 20-minute dive to cut the wire free of the propeller, aware that the submarine would have to dive if spotted by Argentine aircraft and that the heavy seas might cause his lifeline to be parted by the propeller. Either event would almost certainly have resulted in his death. Libby completed the dive successfully and was later awarded the Distinguished Service Medal (DSM).
- The factory ship Westpro caught fire at the dock in Seward, Alaska, causing 1,000 residents to be evacuated due to toxic fumes. The ship was towed away and later sank in the Gulf of Alaska.
- Born:
  - Muriel Noah Ahanda, Cameroonian Olympic sprinter
  - Ayoze Díaz, Spanish footballer; in San Cristóbal de La Laguna, Province of Santa Cruz de Tenerife, Spain
  - Jesper Bech, Danish footballer
  - Joe Berger, National Football League guard; in Fremont, Michigan
  - Esmé Bianco, British actress, DJ and model; in St Albans, Hertfordshire, England
  - Miroslav Blaťák, Czech professional and Olympic ice hockey defenceman; in Gottwaldov, Czechoslovakia
  - Mike Block, American cellist, singer and composer; in Boston, Massachusetts
  - Adam Boyd, English footballer; in Hartlepool, England
  - Daniel Braaten, Norwegian footballer; in Oslo, Norway
  - Joseph Luke Cecchini, Canadian-Italian skeleton racer and police officer; in Trail, British Columbia, Canada
  - Victor Crivoi, Romanian tennis player; in Bucharest, Romania
  - Justin Hodges, Australian rugby league player; in Cairns, Queensland, Australia
  - Aleksandr Ivanov, Russian Olympic javelin thrower; in Leningrad, Russian Soviet Federative Socialist Republic, Soviet Union
  - Sancak Kaplan, Turkish footballer; in Oltu, Erzurum Province, Turkey
  - Ezekiel Kemboi, Kenyan Olympic champion middle-distance runner; in Matira, Elgeyo-Marakwet District, Rift Valley Province, Kenya
  - Christian Kinkela, Congolese footballer; in Kinshasa, Zaire
  - Jason Kubel, Major League Baseball player; in Belle Fourche, South Dakota
  - Irina Meleshina, Russian Olympic long jumper; in Ryazan, Ryazan Oblast, Russian SFSR, Soviet Union
  - Giandomenico Mesto, Italian professional and Olympic footballer; in Monopoli, Italy
  - Natallia Mikhnevich (born Natallia Kharaneka), Belarusian Olympic shot putter; in Nevinnomyssk, Stavropol Krai, Russian SFSR, Soviet Union
  - Stacey Pensgen, American figure skater and meteorologist; in Fairport, New York
  - Ellen Petri, Miss Belgium 2004; in Merksem, Antwerp, Belgium
  - Rasheeda (born Rasheeda Buckner), American rapper, fashion designer and businesswoman; in Atlanta, Georgia
  - Roger Guerreiro, Brazilian-Polish footballer; in São Paulo, Brazil
  - Ramón Sánchez, Salvadoran footballer; in Opico, El Salvador
  - Vitali Tajbert, Kazakhstani-German professional and Olympic boxer; in Mikhaylovka, Kazakh Soviet Socialist Republic, Soviet Union
  - Luke Webster, Australian rules footballer and coach
  - Yoshi-Hashi (born Nobuo Yoshihashi), Japanese professional wrestler; in Tōgō, Aichi, Japan
- Died:
  - Larry J. Blake, 68, American actor
  - Gerhard Conrad, 87, German World War II Luftwaffe general, recipient of the Knight's Cross of the Iron Cross
  - Nikolai Mikhailov, 75, Russian Soviet politician, journalist and diplomat
  - Hermine Sterler (born Minna Stern), 88, German-American actress

== May 26, 1982 (Wednesday) ==
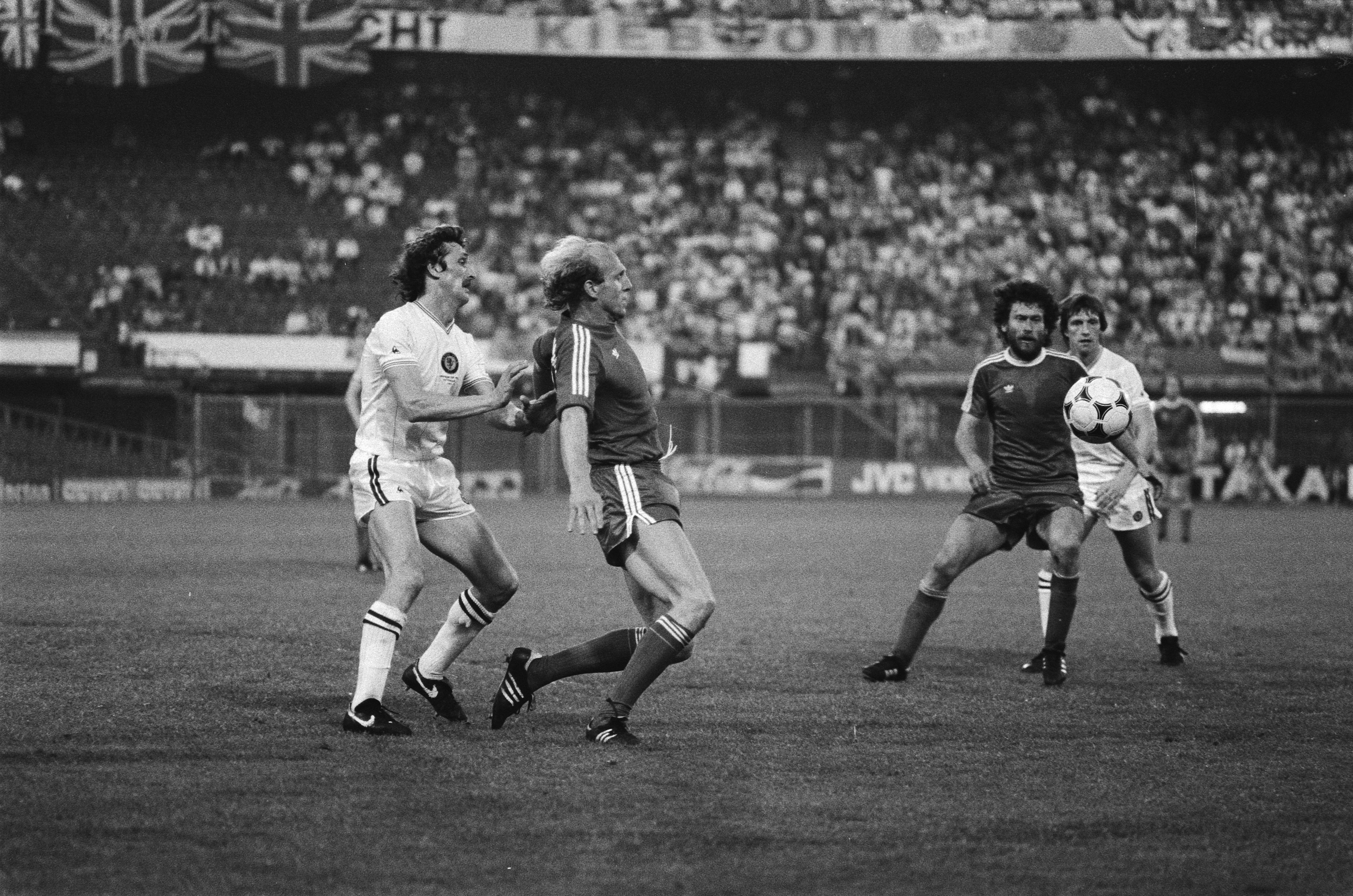
European Cup Final in Rotterdam

- Aston Villa F.C. won the 1982 European Cup Final at De Kuip in Rotterdam, beating Bayern Munich 1–0 after a 69-minute goal by Peter Withe.
- Kielder Water, an artificial lake in Northumberland, was opened.
- The film E.T. the Extra-Terrestrial, directed by Steven Spielberg, debuted on the closing night of the 1982 Cannes Film Festival.
- Students at the University of California, Santa Cruz began a two-day sit-in at the chancellor's office to protest the denial of tenure to Nancy Shaw, an assistant professor of community studies.

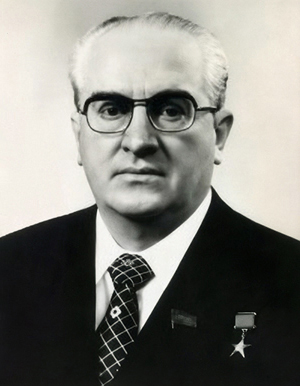
Yuri Andropov

- Yuri Andropov resigned as KGB Chairman due to his appointment as the General Secretary of the Communist Party of the Soviet Union. His shift to a higher political role marked a significant transition in Soviet leadership.
- Born:
  - Monique Alexander, American pornographic actress; in Vallejo, California
  - Kithson Bain, Grenadian footballer; in St. George's, Grenada
  - Joe Cunningham, member of the United States House of Representatives from South Carolina; in Caldwell County, Kentucky
  - Nenad Erić, Serbian-born Kazakh footballer; in Užička Požega, SR Serbia, SFR Yugoslavia
  - Nelson Ferreira, Swiss and Portuguese footballer; in Interlaken, Switzerland
  - Hasan Kabze, Turkish footballer; in Ankara, Turkey
  - Yōsuke Kataoka, Japanese footballer; in Iruma District, Saitama, Japan
  - Sten Lassmann, Estonian pianist
  - Mathieu Martinez, French Nordic combined skier
  - Matko Perdijić, Croatian footballer; in Split, SR Croatia, SFR Yugoslavia
  - Maya Petrova, Russian Olympic champion handball player; in Volgograd, Volgograd Oblast, Russian SFSR, Soviet Union
  - Vahid Talebloo, Iranian footballer; in Tehran, Iran
- Died:
  - Semra Ertan, 25, Turkish migrant worker and writer, suicide by self-immolation.
  - Guillermo Flores Avendaño, 87, Guatemalan general, President of Guatemala
  - Pamela Hinkson, 81, Irish author
  - Emma Horion (born Emma Abeck), 92, German representative of Catholic Women's Welfare in the Christian Women's Movement
  - Beirne Lay Jr., 72, American author, screenwriter and World War II aviator

== May 27, 1982 (Thursday) ==
- In Victoria Falls, Zimbabwe, an African buffalo which had been attacking vehicles for several days was killed instantly when it charged head-on at a moving train.
- Polish authorities announced that Lech Wałęsa, the leader of the Solidarity trade union, who had been in solitary confinement for five months, had been moved to a new place of detention.
- A Moroccan man hijacked a Royal Air Maroc Boeing 727 carrying 91 passengers and nine crewmembers after the plane left Athens during a flight from Damascus, Syria, to Casablanca, Morocco. Taking over the cockpit with what appeared to be a revolver and hand grenade, he ordered the plane to fly to Tunis Carthage Airport, where he released the passengers and then surrendered three hours later. Moroccan authorities stated that the man was mentally disturbed.
- Three fires within eight hours in the Ekofisk oil field, in the Norwegian sector of the North Sea, caused an oil spill about 1,500 yards (1,400 m) by 50 yards (46 m) in size. There were no reported casualties.
- Scottish singer Elaine Simmons, a former winner of the British television talent show New Faces, was seriously injured in an automobile accident on the M9 motorway near Bonnytoun Farm, Linlithgow, Scotland. Simmons and her four backup musicians were transported to the Royal Infirmary of Edinburgh.
- Tottenham Hotspur F.C. won the 1982 FA Cup Final, beating Queens Park Rangers 1–0 in a replay. With the Falklands War underway, Argentinian player Ricardo Villa of Tottenham decided not to play in the final.
- Conservative candidate Tim Smith held the seat of Beaconsfield in a by-election. The Labour Party candidate was future Prime Minister Tony Blair.
- Falklands War: Royal Marines and Paratroops launched a major offensive, moving out of the Port San Carlos bridgehead into the interior of East Falkland.
- In a speech in Dallas, Texas, J. Peter Grace, the head of President Reagan's Private Sector Survey on Cost Control, described the federal food stamp program as a "subsidy for Puerto Ricans". Following demands for his resignation, Grace apologized for his comments the following day, calling them "oratorical mistakes".
- John McMullen purchased the Colorado Rockies of the National Hockey League and received permission to move the team to New Jersey.
- Born:
  - Louis Bell, American record producer and songwriter; in Quincy, Massachusetts
  - Francesca Boscarelli, Italian épée fencer; in Benevento, Italy
  - Kevin De Weert, Belgian professional road bicycle racer; in Duffel, Antwerp Province, Belgium
  - Cathleen Martini, German Olympic bobsledder; in Zwickau, Saxony, East Germany
  - Natalya Neidhart, Canadian-American professional wrestler; in Calgary, Alberta, Canada
  - Mariano Pavone, Argentine footballer; in Tres Sargentos, Argentina
  - Arthur Smith, American college football guard and National Football League head coach; in Memphis, Tennessee
- Died:
  - Enrico Colli, 85, Italian Olympic cross-country skier
  - Thomas B. McCabe, 88, president and chief executive officer of Scott Paper Company

== May 28, 1982 (Friday) ==
- Years of Lead (Italy): In Rome, bombs exploded at the offices of Pan American World Airways and the Italian subsidiary of the Intercontinental insurance company. There were no injuries.
- The 1982 visit by Pope John Paul II to the United Kingdom, the first by a reigning pope, began. The Pope met with Queen Elizabeth II, but canceled a planned meeting with Prime Minister Margaret Thatcher to emphasize that his visit was pastoral and not political. He repeatedly prayed for peace in the Falkland Islands during the day's events. In response to the Pope's remarks, a senior aide to Thatcher commented, "We too want peace, but not peace at any price."
- Falklands War:
  - The Battle of Goose Green began. British forces captured the settlement of Darwin and the Goose Green airstrip.
  - The Reagan Administration announced that the United States was supplying the United Kingdom with missiles and other weapons for use in the Falklands.
- By a 3-to-1 margin, shareholders of Equimark Corp. approved a controversial deal for the company to issue stock to Chase Manhattan Corp. Chase would also receive 15-year options to buy Equimark subsidiaries Equibank and Nottingham Corp.
- Edward Thomas Mann, a former IBM salesman, committed a mass shooting at an IBM office building in Bethesda, Maryland after crashing his car through the building's glass doors. Mann, carrying two rifles, a shotgun and a pistol, killed two people and wounded eight before surrendering to police.
- John Hinckley Jr.'s defense team screened the film Taxi Driver in the courtroom as part of Hinckley's insanity defense in the March 1981 attempted assassination of Ronald Reagan. This was Hinckley's 16th viewing of the film. He looked away from the screen only once, during the scene in which Jodie Foster's character dances with her pimp.
- A Beechcraft aircraft owned by the city of Portsmouth, Virginia, crashed into an empty house in Owen Brown, Columbia, Maryland, while attempting to land at Baltimore/Washington International Airport, killing four Portsmouth city officials and Portsmouth Police Department Patrolman Joseph M. Weth Jr., the pilot of the aircraft.
- Ford Motor Company and Chrysler Corporation both announced large automobile product recalls. Ford recalled over 141,800 cars due to fire hazards, while Chrysler recalled 4,000 cars and trucks with defective ball joint bolts.
- Four 17th-century paintings, including works attributed to Rembrandt and Frans Hals, were discovered to have been stolen from a basement storage room at the Detroit Institute of Arts. The paintings were collectively valued at more than $300,000.
- Speaking to the 22nd U.S.-Mexico Interparliamentary Conference in Santa Barbara, California, U.S. President Ronald Reagan reassured attendees that the United States was sensitive to Latin America's sympathy for Argentina, despite its own support for the United Kingdom in the Falklands War.
- Two years after its founder pleaded no contest to conspiracy to murder, Synanon, an alcohol rehabilitation program that had evolved into a self-described "church", lost its tax-exempt status.
- In Everett, Washington, Snohomish County Superior Court Judge Robert Bibb found 61-year-old Ruth Coe guilty of attempting to hire a hitman to kill the judge and prosecutor who convicted her son of rape. Frederick Coe, known as the "South Hill Rapist", had been sentenced to life in prison plus 75 years in 1981.

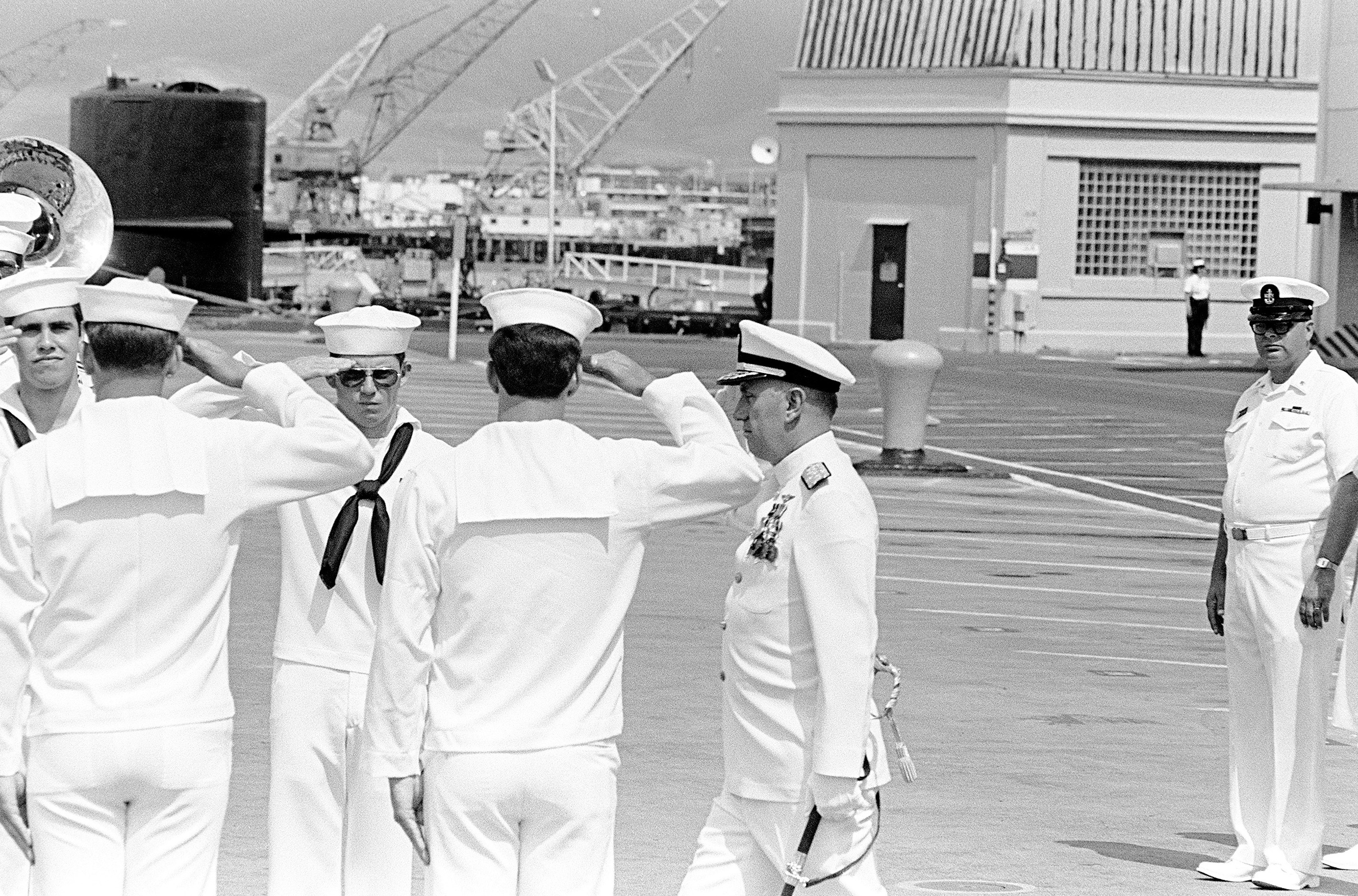
Admiral Sylvester R. Foley Jr. at the end of the ceremony marking his assumption of command of the U.S. Pacific Fleet

- Admiral Sylvester R. Foley Jr. assumed command of the United States Pacific Fleet from Admiral James D. Watkins.
- At about 5:00 p.m., Joseph Billie Gwin, wanting "to prevent World War III", forced his way into the studios of CBS affiliate KOOL-TV in Phoenix, Arizona, fired a gunshot, took four people hostage (holding one of them, cameraman Louis Villa, at close gunpoint), and demanded national broadcasting time. Three hours later, Gwin released two hostages, Jack Webb and Bob Cimino. At 9:30 p.m., with Gwin sitting next to him with a gun, KOOL anchor Bill Close read a 20-minute statement from Gwin. Among other oddities, Gwin's statement included an appeal to country singer Johnny Cash to ask Queen Elizabeth II to evacuate London before Argentina could drop an atomic bomb on it. When finished with the statement, Close took Gwin's gun and set it on the table. Gwin surrendered to police following the broadcast of the statement; he was charged with kidnapping, assault, and burglary, and was later declared insane.
- American film critic Leonard Maltin made his first appearance on the television news magazine Entertainment Tonight.
- Born:
  - Marisa Brunner, Swiss footballer; in Aarau, Switzerland
  - Alexa Davalos, French-American actress; in Paris, France
  - Desiree del Valle (born Desirée Lois del Valle Dunham), Filipino actress; in Manila, Philippines
  - Jhonny Peralta, Dominican-American Major League Baseball shortstop and third baseman; in Santiago Province (Dominican Republic)
- Died:
  - Boris Chirkov, 80, Russian and Soviet actor and pedagogue
  - Roberto Estévez, 25, Argentine Army officer, killed in action at the Battle of Goose Green
  - Alexander Hurd, 71, Canadian Olympic speed skater
  - H. Jones, VC, OBE, 42, British Army officer, killed in action at the Battle of Goose Green
  - Wiesław Maniak, 44, Polish Olympic track and field athlete
  - Carlo Miranda, 69, Italian mathematician
  - Herbert A. Wagner, 82, Austrian aerodynamicist

== May 29, 1982 (Saturday) ==
- Outside Salerno, Italy, gunmen ambushed the car of prosecutor Alfonso Lamberti, an opponent of organized crime, wounding him and killing Simonetta Lamberti, his 11-year-old daughter.
- 1982 visit by Pope John Paul II to the United Kingdom: The Pope met with Charles, Prince of Wales, prior to taking part in a service at Canterbury Cathedral. Robert Runcie, the Archbishop of Canterbury, presented the Pope with a copy of T. S. Eliot's play Murder in the Cathedral.
- Paul McCartney served as best man at the wedding of his brother, Michael McCartney, to dress designer Rowena Horne at St. Barnabas Church in Penny Lane, Liverpool, England.
- Falklands War: The Battle of Goose Green ended, with British forces defeating a larger Argentine force on Argentine Army Day.
- Cold War: In a five-year defense plan, the Pentagon outlined its strategy to fight a potential nuclear war against the Soviet Union.
- At Kennedy Space Center in Florida, a simulated countdown for the STS-4 space shuttle mission concluded with a simulated launch at 3:20 p.m., delayed from 11:00 a.m. due to computer problems. The actual launch of Space Shuttle Columbia would carry NASA astronauts Ken Mattingly and Henry Hartsfield into orbit on June 27.
- A tornado outbreak caused 10 deaths and almost 200 injuries in Marion, Illinois and Williamson County, Illinois.
- Four members of a Colorado family were killed in a single-engine plane crash near Boerne, Texas.
- The Waterfront Streetcar made its first run between Pioneer Square and Pier 70 in Seattle, Washington.
- Born:
  - Ailyn (born Pilar María Del Carmen Mónica Giménez García), Spanish singer and songwriter; in Esplugues de Llobregat, Barcelonès, Spain
  - Hisham Mohd Ashour, Egyptian professional squash player; in Cairo, Egypt
  - Anita Briem, Icelandic actress; in Reykjavík, Iceland
  - Ana Beatriz Barros, Brazilian model; in Itabira, Minas Gerais, Brazil
  - Romel Beck, Mexican professional basketball player
  - Mario René Berríos, Honduran footballer; in Tela, Honduras
  - David França Oliveira e Silva, Brazilian footballer; in Araxá, Brazil
  - Nataliya Dobrynska, Ukrainian Olympic champion heptathlete; in Brovary, Kyiv Oblast, Ukrainian SSR, Soviet Union
  - André Ghem, Brazilian professional tennis player; in Porto Alegre, Brazil
  - William Gradit, French professional basketball player; in Strasbourg, France
  - Mark Hapka, American actor; in Buffalo, New York
  - Anastasiya Karlovich, Ukrainian chess Woman Grandmaster and journalist; in Dnipropetrovsk, Ukrainian SSR, Soviet Union
  - Kim Tae-kyun, South Korean baseball first baseman
  - Matt Macri, Major League Baseball third baseman; in Des Moines, Iowa
  - Dennis Masina, Swazi footballer; in Mbabane, Swaziland
  - Elyas M'Barek, Austrian actor; in Munich, Bavaria, West Germany
  - Geoffroy Messina, French rugby union player; in La Tronche, Isère, France
  - Saleh Al Sheikh, Kuwaiti footballer; in Kuwait City, Kuwait
  - Sandra-Helena Tavares, Portuguese Olympic pole vaulter; in Spain
- Died:
  - Rudy Debnar, 66, American professional basketball player
  - Walter Harzer, 69, German SS commander
  - Romy Schneider, 43, German-French actress

== May 30, 1982 (Sunday) ==
- Cold War: Spain became the 16th member of the North Atlantic Treaty Organization (NATO) and the first nation to enter the alliance since West Germany's admission in 1955.
- 1982 visit by Pope John Paul II to the United Kingdom: The Pope visited Liverpool, where he told crowds at Speke Airport that unemployment, a major problem in the city, "tends to sow seeds of bitterness, division and even violence... This tragedy affects every aspect of life." The Pope then attended a prayer service at the Anglican Liverpool Cathedral and celebrated Mass at the Roman Catholic Liverpool Metropolitan Cathedral.
- At about 3:45 a.m., authorities were called to Los Angeles International Airport due to the discovery of a bomb at an Air Canada freight terminal. FBI agents defused the bomb before 7 a.m. Several Armenians were arrested.
- Belisario Betancur of the Colombian Conservative Party won the 1982 Colombian presidential election, defeating former President Alfonso López Michelsen, the Colombian Liberal Party candidate.
- 1980 Olympic champion ice hockey goaltender Jim Craig was charged with driving to endanger after a two-car crash which killed 29-year-old Margaret Curry of New Bedford, Massachusetts. Craig would be acquitted of vehicular homicide by a judge on September 14.

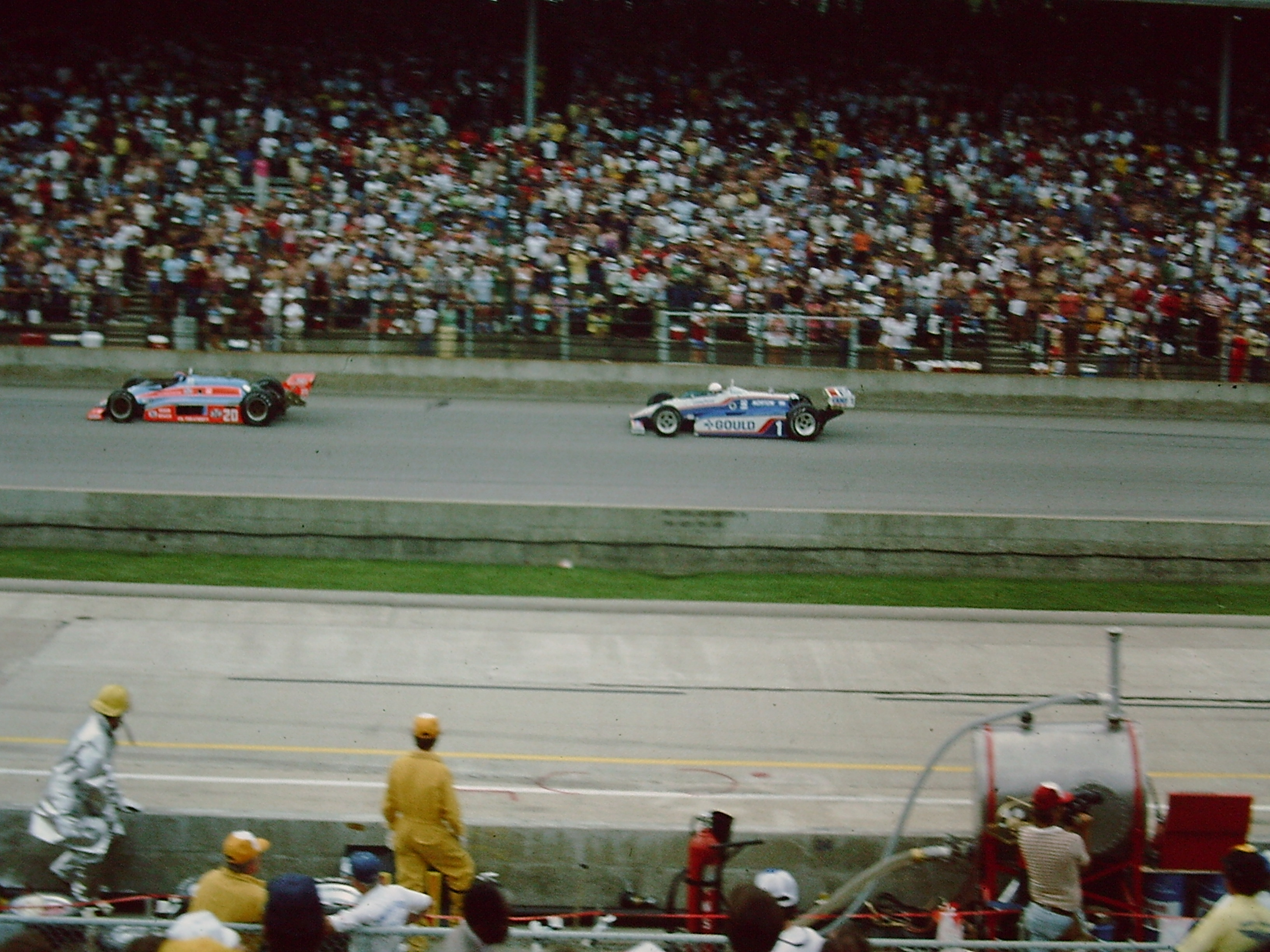
Johncock leading Mears near the end of the 1982 Indianapolis 500

- At the 1982 Indianapolis 500, 1973 winner Gordon Johncock won his second race over 1979 winner Rick Mears by 0.16 seconds. Leading to the closest finish to this date, Mears drew alongside Johncock with a lap remaining, after erasing a seemingly insurmountable advantage of 11 seconds in the final 10 laps, in what Indianapolis Motor Speedway historian Donald Davidson later called the greatest finish in the track's history up to that time.
- Neil Bonnett won the 1982 World 600 at Charlotte Motor Speedway in Charlotte, North Carolina.
- Cal Ripken Jr. played the first of what would eventually become his record-breaking streak of 2,632 consecutive Major League Baseball games in the United States.
- 91-year-old Rose Kennedy, matriarch of the Kennedy family, was admitted to St. Mary's Hospital in West Palm Beach, Florida for medical observation due to feeling unwell.
- Born:
  - Miłosz Bernatajtys, Polish Olympic rower; in Słupsk, Słupsk Voivodeship, Poland
  - Ricardo Canales, Honduran footballer; in La Ceiba, Honduras
  - Eddie Griffin, National Basketball Association player; in Philadelphia, Pennsylvania (d. 2007)
  - Kabamba Musasa, Congolese footballer; in Kinshasa, Zaire
  - James Simpson-Daniel, English rugby union player; in Stockton-on-Tees, England
- Died: Albert Norden, 77, German communist politician

== May 31, 1982 (Monday) ==
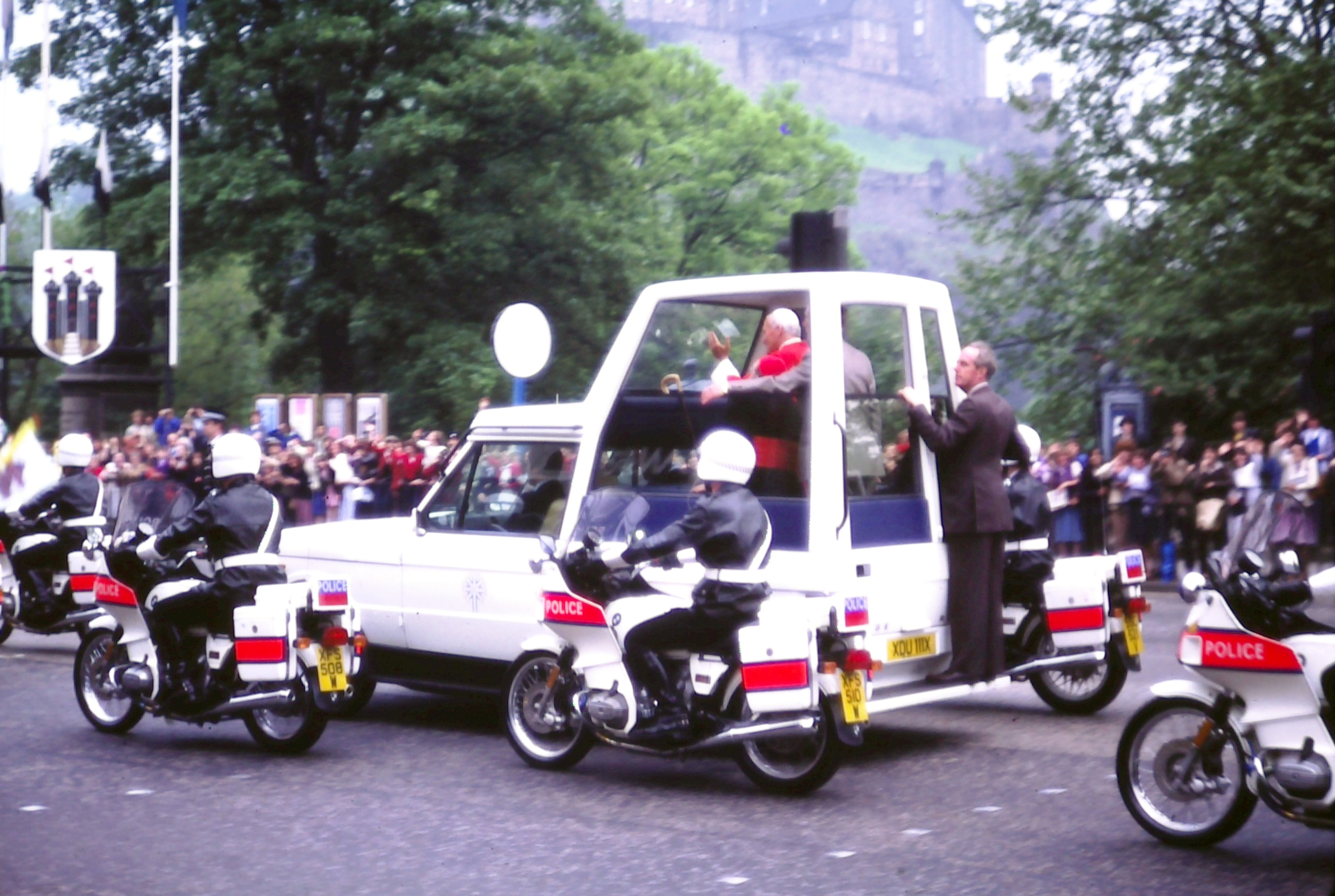
Pope John Paul II arrives in Princes Street from Edinburgh Airport in the Popemobile

- 1982 visit by Pope John Paul II to the United Kingdom: The Pope traveled from Liverpool to Manchester, where he met with Sir Immanuel Jakobovits, Chief Rabbi of the United Hebrew Congregations of the Commonwealth. He then traveled to York, where he addressed 200,000 people at York Racecourse, praying for the families of victims of the Falklands War. The Pope then flew to Scotland, where he spoke to 50,000 young people at Murrayfield Stadium in Edinburgh. 100 protesters, led by Ian Paisley, clashed with police outside the General Assembly Hall of the Church of Scotland; 10 people were arrested.
- Falklands War:
  - Operation Algeciras failed when the Spanish police discovered the plot. The commandos were deported back to Argentina.
  - In the skirmish at Top Malo House, 19 Royal Marines from the Mountain and Arctic Warfare Cadre defeated Argentine Special Forces who had taken up a position in an isolated farmhouse on East Falkland.
- Born:
  - Ashley Battle, American professional basketball player; in Pittsburgh, Pennsylvania
  - Edinho (born Éder Luciano), Brazilian footballer; in Cariacica, Espírito Santo, Brazil
  - Ananda Everingham, Australian-Thai actor and model; in Bangkok, Thailand
  - Trésor Luntala, Congolese international footballer; in Kinshasa, Zaire
  - Fränzi Mägert-Kohli, Swiss Olympic snowboarder; in Thun, Canton of Bern, Switzerland
  - Steph McGovern, British journalist and television presenter; in Middlesbrough, North Yorkshire, England
  - Maja Sokač (born Maja Zebić), Croatian professional and Olympic handball player; in Split, SR Croatia, SFR Yugoslavia
  - Emily Stellato, Italian professional tennis and padel player; in Sezze, Province of Latina, Italy
  - Jonathan Tucker, American actor; in Boston, Massachusetts
  - Erion Xhafa, Albanian footballer; in Tirana, Albania
  - Francesco Zizzari, Italian footballer; in La Spezia, Italy
- Died: Carlo Mauri, 52, Italian mountaineer and explorer

== See also ==
- Deaths in May 1982
