= Dennis Tobenski =

American composer (born 1982)

- Born: Dennis Marshall Tobenski; April 18, 1982 (age 44)
- Origin: Kankakee, Illinois, United States
- Genres: Contemporary music
- Occupations: Composer, conductor, singer
- Instruments: Voice, viola, piano
- Years active: 1996 –
- Website: dennistobenski.com

Dennis Tobenski (born April 18, 1982, in Kankakee, Illinois) is an American composer of contemporary classical music and art song.

== Life ==
Born on April 18, 1982, Dennis M. Tobenski grew up in Kankakee, Illinois. In 2004, he graduated from Illinois State University, where he studied Vocal Performance with baritone John M. Koch, and Music Theory & Composition with Stephen Andrew Taylor, David Feurzeig and Serra Hwang. After graduating from ISU in 2004, he was invited to move to New York City to study privately with composer Daron Hagen.

Tobenski was commissioned by the ISU School of Theatre to compose music for Shakespeare's The Tempest: the inaugural production of the newly constructed Center for the Performing Arts, which led him to write for several subsequent School of Theatre mainstage productions. These included Bertolt Brecht's The Caucasian Chalk Circle, Frank McGuinness' adaptation of Sophocles’ Electra. The ISU College of Fine Arts commissioned the 2002 Elegy, a work for choir and chamber ensemble commemorating the events of September 11, 2001, and the 2004 Soliloquy for solo flute.

Tobenski was commissioned in 2002 by baritone John M. Koch (whose 1996 performance of Il barbiere di Siviglia with the Florentine Opera was broadcast on PBS) to write Three Poems of Thomas Hardy. He later wrote music for the 2004 Chicago production of The Living Canvas, a performance art work for theatre that combines movement and dance with photographed images projected on the unclothed human form.

He has written numerous works for the ISU Madrigal Singers, including Fair Robin I Love, a work commissioned for the 50th Anniversary Season of the ISU Madrigal Dinners –- the oldest tradition of its kind in the Midwest.

Along with composer Jeff Algera, in April 2006, he co-founded the Tobenski-Algera Concert Series, a series devoted to the performance and promotion of new works by young and emerging composers.

In 2007, Tobenski began graduate study in composition at the City College of New York with composer David Del Tredici.

As of March 2006, he resides in New York City.

== Vocal career ==
Tobenski sang in the premieres of new works by composers Darien Shulman, Jeff Algera, and Hadar Noiberg. He has also sung the New York premieres of cycles by Chester Biscardi, Roger Zahab, and David Del Tredici.

He sang the premiere of the piano transcription of David Del Tredici's song cycle Gay Life at the CUNY Graduate Center's Elebash Hall, June 19, 2007, with the composer at the piano. On the same program, he sang the New York premieres of Chester Biscardi's Modern Love Songs and Roger Zahab's Autumn Songs.

== Selected list of works ==
=== Song Cycles ===
- Three Poems of Thomas Hardy (2001)
- And He'll Be Mine for tenor and piano (2005)
- till night is overgone for tenor and piano (2007)
- Sweet Briar Songs for medium voice and piano (2007)
- echoes for soprano and piano (2008)

=== Chamber works ===
- String Quartet No. 1 (2005)
- Songs of Love & Madness for flute, clarinet, violin, cello, piano, and percussion (2006)
- Starfish at Pescadero for soprano, viola, harp, and percussion (2007)
- Letter from a Young Poet for cello and piano (2008)

=== Choral works ===
- The Passionate Shepherd to His Love (2001)
- Jabberwocky (2002)
- Elegy (2002)
- My True Love Hath My Heart (2003)
- The Voice of the Rain (2005)
