= Xavier Gil =

Andorran footballer (born 1982)

Personal information
- Full name: Francesc Xavier Gil Sánchez
- Date of birth: 24 May 1982 (age 44)
- Place of birth: Andorra
- Height: 1.76 m (5 ft 9 1/2 in)
- Position: Defender

Team information
- Current team: FC Santa Coloma
- Number: 3

Senior career*
Years	Team	Apps	(Gls)
2002–2003	FC Andorra		
2003–2004	FC Santa Coloma		
2004–2007	FC Andorra		
2007–	FC Santa Coloma		

International career
2001–	Andorra	3	(0)
- * Club domestic league appearances and goals

Francesc Xavier Gil Sánchez (born 24 May 1982), commonly known as Xavier Gil, is an Andorran footballer, who currently plays for FC Santa Coloma and Andorra national team.

== International career ==
Gil made his debut on 21 August 2002, coming on as a substitute for Justo Ruiz in a 3–0 friendly match defeat against Iceland. He has been capped three times.

== National team statistics ==
Andorra national team
Year	Apps	Goals
2001	1	0
2002	1	0
2003	0	0
2004	0	0
2005	0	0
2006	0	0
2007	0	0
2008	0	0
2009	0	0
2010	1	0
Total	3	0
