= Federico Crescentini =

Sammarinese footballer

Personal information
- Date of birth: 13 April 1982
- Place of birth: San Marino
- Date of death: 15 December 2006 (aged 24)
- Place of death: Acapulco, Mexico
- Height: 1.82 m (5 ft 11 1/2 in)
- Position: Defender

Senior career*
Years	Team	Apps	(Gls)
2001–2002	Virtus Villa		
2004–2005	AS Real Misano		
2005–2006	S.P. Tre Fiori		

International career^{‡}
2002–2006	San Marino	8	(0)
- * Club domestic league appearances and goals as of 13 December 2006 ‡ National team caps and goals as of 13 December 2006

Federico Crescentini (13 April 1982 – 15 December 2006) was a Sammarinese football defender. He played eight times for his country's national team.

== Club career ==
Crescentini played in the Italian amateur leagues before moving to Sanmarinese side Tre Fiori in 2005.

== International career ==
He made his debut for San Marino in a May 2002 friendly match against Estonia, coming on as a substitute for Giacomo Maiani. He earned his 8th and final cap against Ireland in November 2006, substituting Damiano Vannucci.

== Death ==
He died while on holiday in Acapulco, Mexico when he tried to help a friend in trouble, but despite rescuing her, he drowned. He was the third footballer to drown in the course of a single week, after Juventus FC's youth players Riccardo Neri and Alessio Ferramosca drowned at the club's training ground. At the time of his death, he was 24. His funeral took place in Montegiardino, San Marino.
