= Deaths in May 1982 =

The following is a list of notable deaths in May 1982.

Entries for each day are listed alphabetically by surname. A typical entry lists information in the following sequence:

- Name, age, country of citizenship at birth, subsequent country of citizenship (if applicable), reason for notability, cause of death (if known), and reference.

== May 1982 ==
=== 1 ===
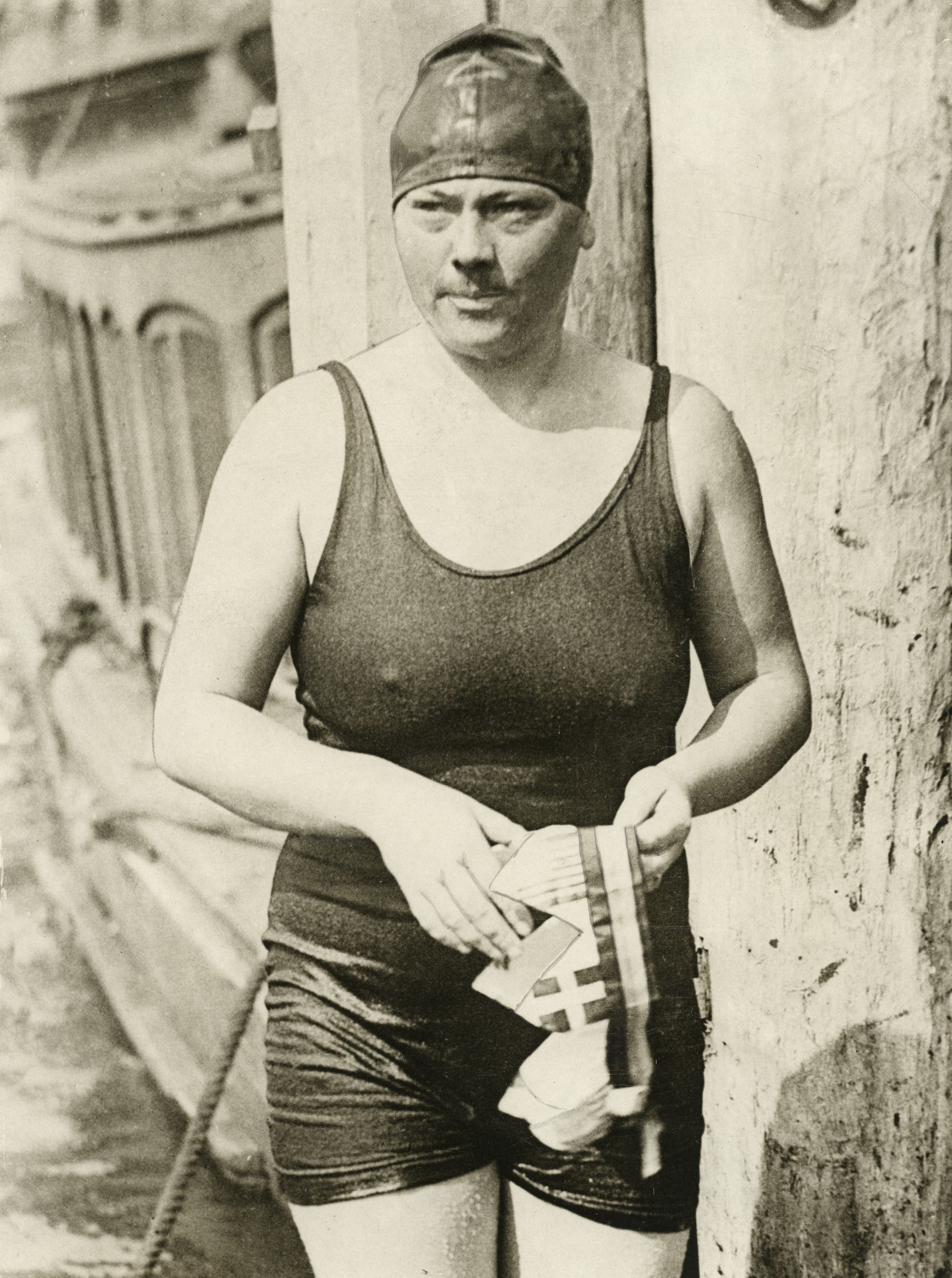
Amelia Gade Corson

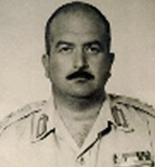
Hussein ibn Nasser

- Kenneth Beck, 67, American water polo player and Olympian
- Edwin N. Clark, 80, American lawyer and military officer
- Amelia Gade Corson, 85, Danish-born American long-distance swimmer
- Albert Fitzgerald, 75, American trade union leader
- Beryl Follet, 74, American football player
- Grant Gilmore, 72, American law professor
- Samuel Juster, 86, American architect who practiced during the mid-20th century in New York City and New Jersey
- Alexander Kutateli, 84, Georgian and Soviet writer and translator
- Jay Laurence Lush, 86, American pioneering animal geneticist
- Everett McGowan, 82, American professional ice hockey player
- Hussein ibn Nasser, 79, Jordanian prince and statesman who served as the 16th Prime Minister of Jordan
- Brian O'Brien, 59, New Zealand boxer, journalist and politician
- Jake Pelkington, 66, American professional basketball player
- William Primrose, 77, Scottish violist and teacher, he was a member of both the London String Quartet and the NBC Symphony Orchestra, cancer
- Anthony Hoskyns-Abrahall, 78, Anglican priest and bishop
- Torajirō Saitō, 77, Japanese film director
- Gene Sheldon, 74, American actor, mime artist, and musician, primarily remembered for playing the mute servant Bernardo in Walt Disney's Western series Zorro (1957–1959), heart attack
- Margaret Sheridan (married name Margaret Wildman), 55, American actress
- Wolfgang Stammberger, 61, German jurist and politician
- Harcus Strachan, 97, Scottish born Canadian recipient of the Victoria Cross
- Mikhaïl Suzumov, 88, Soviet Russian historian
- Mir Rasool Bux Talpur, 61, Pakistani politician and officeholder
- Eddie Tryon, 81, American football player
- Walther Wenck, 81, German military officer and industrialist

=== 2 ===
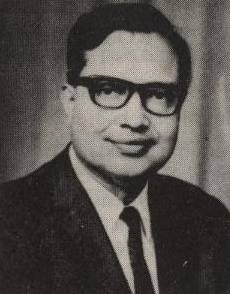
Nirmal Kumar Dutta

- Salomon Bochner, 82, Galizien-born mathematician
- Leo Callahan, 91, American professional baseball player
- Helmut Dantine, 63, Austrian-American actor and film producer, typecast in portraying Nazis, vice-president of Schenck Enterprises, the production company of his uncle-in-law Joseph Schenck, heart attack
- Patrick Dooley, 72, Irish Fianna Fáil politician
- Nirmal Kumar Dutta, 68, Indian pharmacologist, medical academic and the director of Haffkine Institute, Mumbai
- James Fitton, 83, English painter, lithographer and theatre set designer
- Hugh Marlowe, 71, American actor (Ellery Queen). heart attack
- Allan Montgomery, 61, Australian rules footballer
- John Ryan, 33, Australian rugby union and professional rugby league footballer
- Bill Sefton, 67, American pole vaulter
- Wini Shaw, 75, American actress, dancer, and singer, in film she introduced the song "Lullaby of Broadway" and performed the song "The Lady in Red"
- Virginia Vestoff, 42, American actress

=== 3 ===
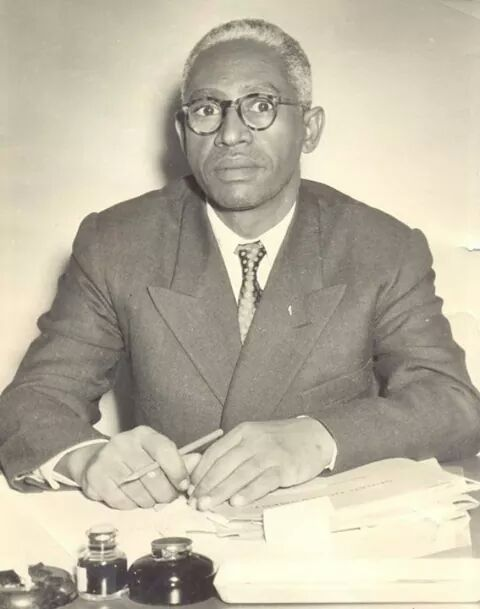
Ibrahim Yusuf Sulayman

- Mohammed Seddik Benyahia, 50, Algerian politician and diplomat who was a militant nationalist during the Algerian War. He served as a member of the Algerian delegation in negotiations with the French government for the Evian Accords (1962), and was a cabinet member for fifteen years. His airplane was shot down on the Iran–Turkey border during his mediation mission in the Iran–Iraq War.
- Ella Florence Fondren, 101, American philanthropist
- Brenda Frazier, 60, American socialite
- Kanchi Kalyanasundaram, 72, Indian politician
- Margit Nordin, 84, Swedish gymnastics director
- Rajni Patel, 67, Indian politician and barrister
- Werner Schwier, 60, German actor
- Ibrahim Yusuf Sulayman, 73 or 74, Sudanese politician
- Henri Tajfel, 62, Polish social psychologist
- Rex Townley, 78, Australian politician and cricket player
- William Whitelaw, 75, Scottish first-class cricketer

=== 4 ===
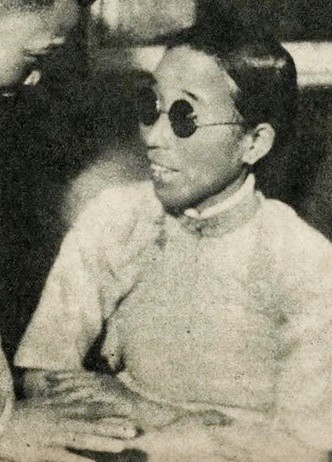
Huang Bamei

- Huang Bamei, 75 or 76, Chinese pirate leader who served as a naval commander in the Second Sino-Japanese War
- Georges Aleka Damas, 79, Gabonese politician who served as president of the National Assembly of Gabon from 1964 through 1975
- Lillian Gilmore, 72, America actress
- Harry Hays, 72, Canadian politician who was the 27th Mayor of Calgary
- Edna Holland, 86, American actress ruptured aneurysm
- Barnett Janner, 89, British politician
- Charles O. McManiman, 82, American politician from Michigan
- Leo W. O'Brien, 81, American journalist, radio and television commentator, and politician

=== 5 ===
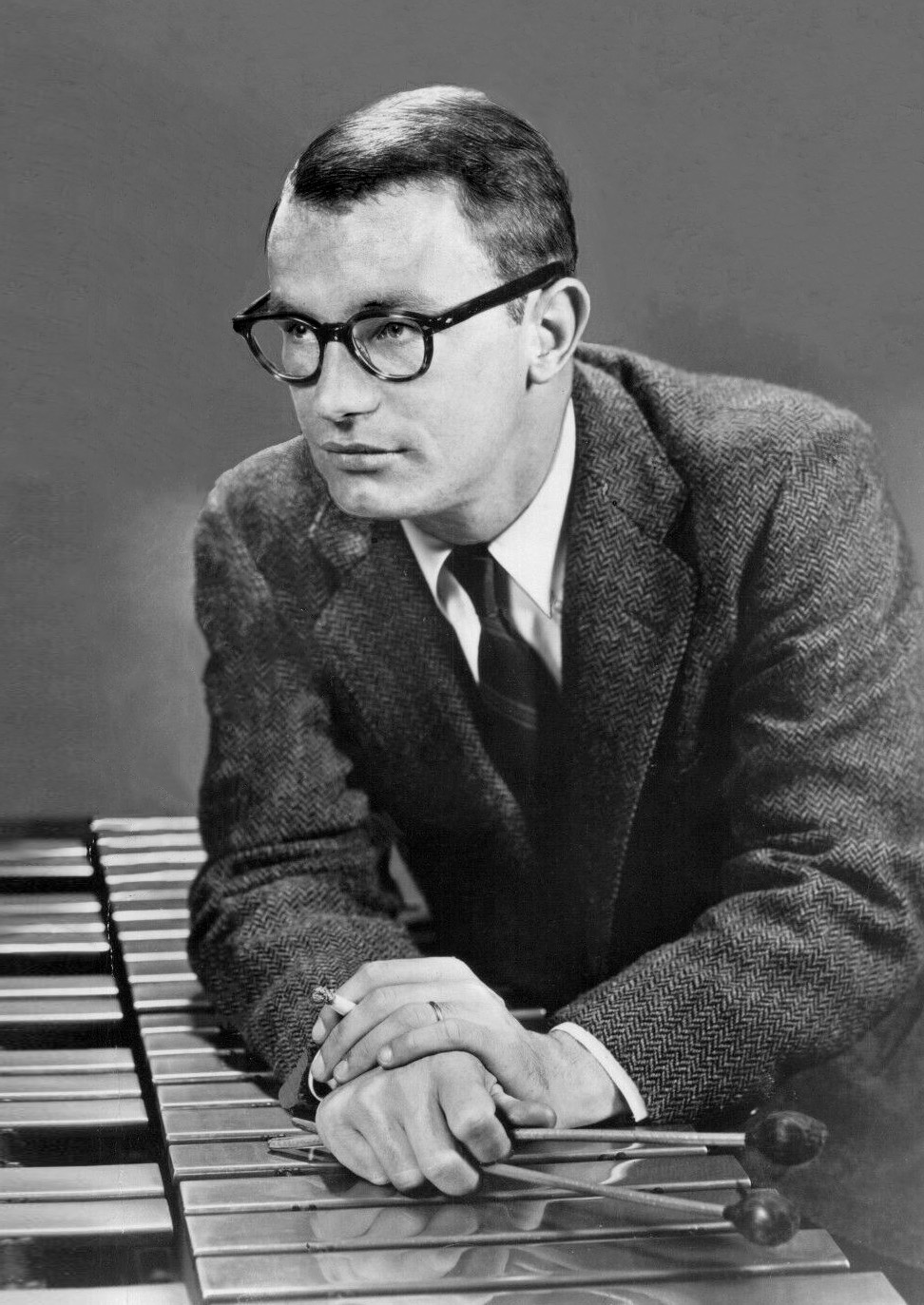
Cal Tjader

- Accamma Cherian, 73, Indian independence activist
- Ian Hill, 77, Scottish cardiologist
- Denis Hill-Wood, 75, English cricketer and the chairman of Arsenal Football Club
- Julio Irazusta, 82, Argentine writer and politician
- Irmgard Keun, 77, German novelist
- Phuljhuri Khan, 61 or 62, Bangladeshi musician
- Mauricio Cardozo Ocampo, 74, Paraguayan composer and singer
- Nikolai Organov, 81, Soviet politician and statesman
- Sue Pritzker, 49, American socialite, philanthropist, and reproductive rights activist
- Hossein Qajeyi, 23, Iranian military officer
- Cal Tjader, 56, American Latin Jazz musician, he is often described as the most successful non-Latino Latin musician, he is linked to the development of the then-new music genres of Latin rock and acid jazz, heart attack while on the road with his band in Manila
- Ernie Watson, 73, Australian rules footballer who played with Essendon

=== 6 ===
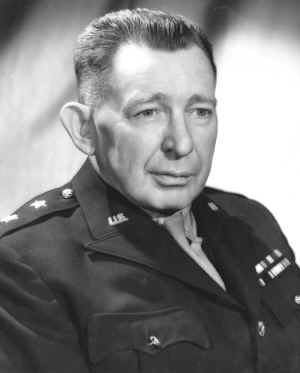
Robert McGowan Littlejohn

- Nancy Adam, 94, Scottish trade union official
- Faiz Mohammad Baloch, 81 or 82, Balochi folk musician and folk singer
- William P. Durkee III, 63, American diplomat, lawyer, and public official
- Rosamond Harding, 84, English music scholar, writer, organologist and instrument collector
- Hibiscus, 32, American actor and performance artist, he took part in the anti-war march March on the Pentagon (1967), and he appeared in Bernie Boston's Pulitzer Prize-nominated photograph, Flower Power; Hibiscus was the turtleneck sweater-wearing protester photographed putting flowers into the gun barrels of a soldier of the 503rd Military Police Battalion (Airborne), he was the founder of the psychedelic gay liberation theater collective known as the Cockettes, death from pneumonia and complications from AIDS. At the time of his death, AIDS was known as GRID or "gay cancer", and was highly stigmatized.
- Pinocchio James, 54, American singer
- Robert McGowan Littlejohn, 91, major general in the United States Army
- Art Macioszczyk, 61, American professional football fullback
- Beauty McGowan, 79, American baseball player
- Endel Press, 53, Estonian swimmer
- Salvatore Ruggiero, 36, American mobster
- Herman T. Schneebeli, 74, American politician

=== 7 ===
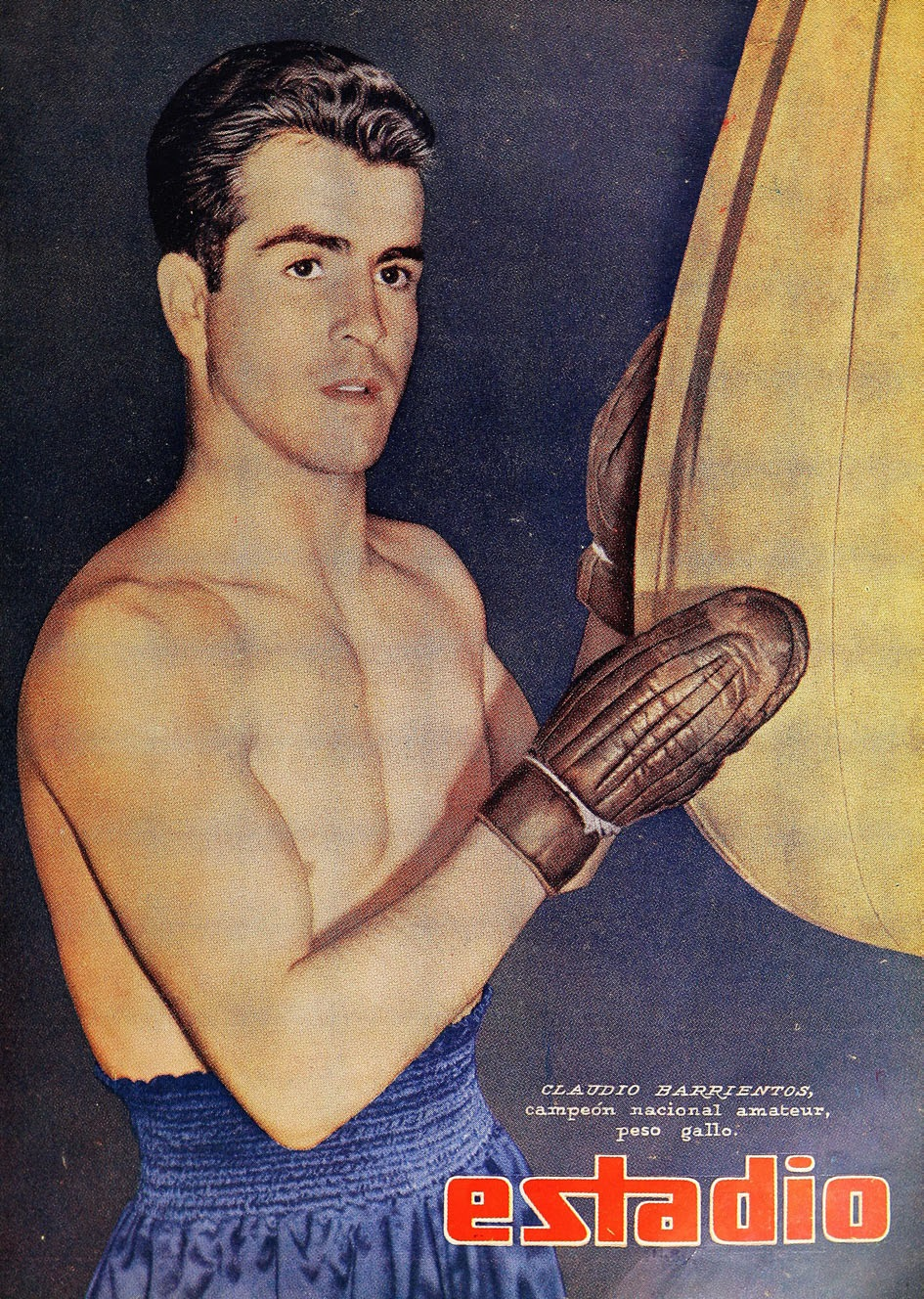
Claudio Barrientos

- Alfred Adam, 74, French actor
- Claudio Barrientos, 46, Chilean boxer
- Lloyd Gullickson, 83, American professional golfer
- Vi Jordan, 68, Australian politician
- George Provens, 63, American baseball player for the Cleveland Buckeyes

=== 8 ===
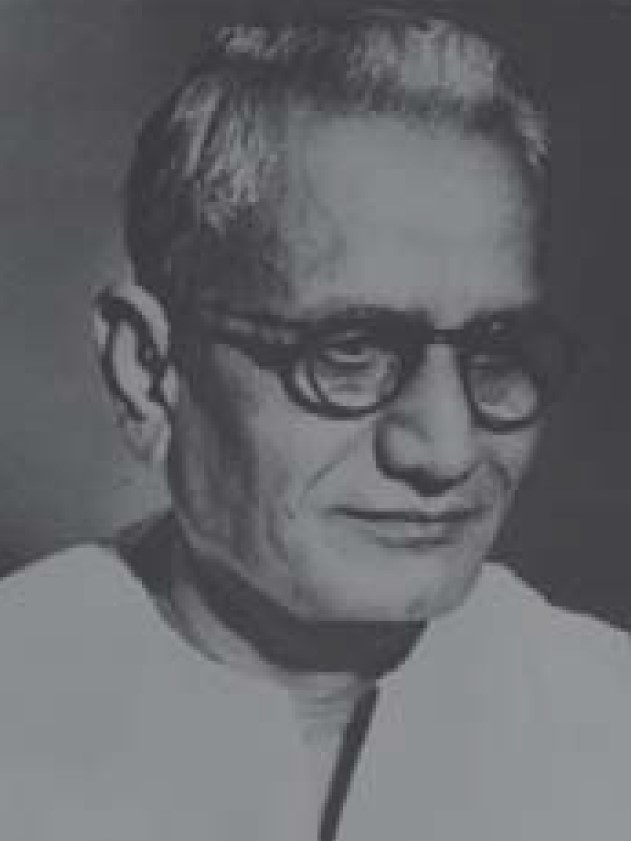
Atmaram Ravaji Deshpande

- Salomea Andronikova, 94, Georgian socialite and salonist remembered for her association with several writers of the Silver Age of Russian Poetry in pre-revolutionary Saint Petersburg, who celebrated her physical and intellectual charms in their works.
- Sam Baker, 75, American actor,he played Queequeg in The Sea Beast (1926),which was the first film adaptation of Herman Melville's 1851 novel Moby-Dick, and Hugo in the science fiction film serial The Lost City (1935).
- Neil Bogart, 39, American record executive who founded Casablanca Records
- Leonor Cecotto, 61 or 62, Latin American painter and engraver
- Atmaram Ravaji Deshpande, 80, Marathi poet
- Bernie Glow, 56, American trumpeter
- Anatoli Kacharava, 71, Soviet and Georgian sea captain
- Al Leader, 78, Canadian ice hockey administrator and player
- Anita Pittoni, 81, Italian textile craftswoman, clothing designer, writer, and publisher
- Gilles Villeneuve, 32, Canadian racing driver who competed in Formula One from 1977 to 1982. He won six Grands Prix. He was seriously injured in an accident at the 1982 Belgian Grand Prix. After being hospitalized, he was diagnosed with a fatal fracture of the neck and died soon after.

=== 9 ===
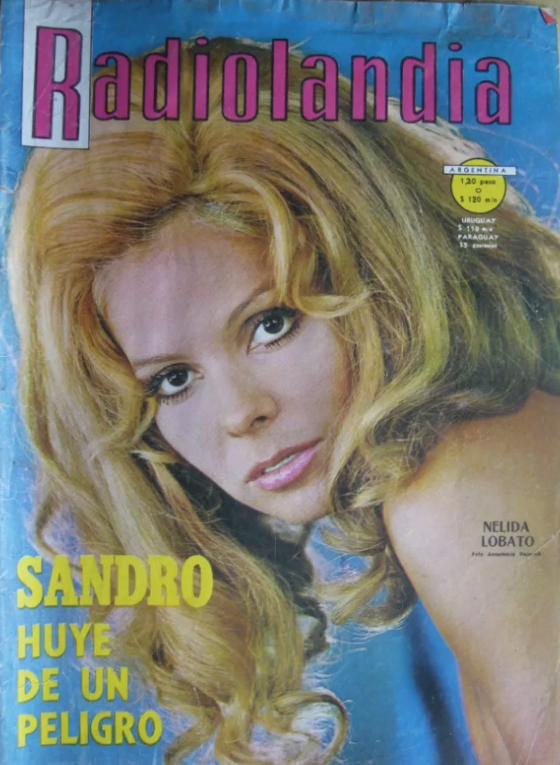
Nelida Lobato

- Del W. Carroll, 62, American champion polo player, Thoroughbred racehorse owner/trainer, and soldier during World War II
- W. Beverly Carter Jr., 61, American diplomat and journalist
- René González, 63, Cuban professional baseball player
- Nelida Lobato, 47, Argentine actress, dancer, and model cancer
- Dorothy Binney Palmer, 93, American explorer, socialite, and friend to Amelia Earhart
- Renato Côrte Real, 57, Brazilian comedian and actor
- John Smith, 75, American baseball first baseman
- Petr Svojtka, 35, Czech actor
- Madeline Willemsen, 66, Puerto Rican actress, comedian, and writer

=== 10 ===
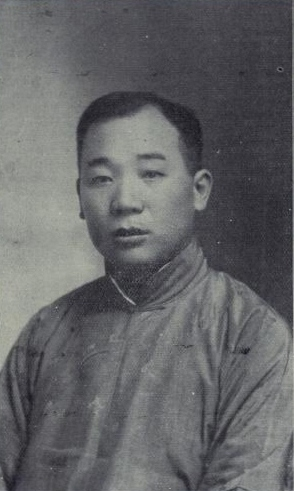
Ma Yinchu

- Villem Ernits, 90, Estonian linguist and politician
- Winston Jenkins, 69 or 70, South African cricketer
- Raymond Jonson, 90, American modernist painter
- Ron Lundy, 75, American radio announcer and DJ
- Vivian Carter Mason, 82, American civil rights activist
- Don L. Short, 78, American cattle rancher and politician
- Vilém Šindler, 78, Czech middle-distance runner and Olympian.
- Peter Weiss, 65, German-born Swedish writer, painter, graphic artist, and experimental filmmaker
- Alex Weyand, 90, American football player, Olympian, Army officer and sports historian
- Ma Yinchu, 99, Chinese economist

=== 11 ===
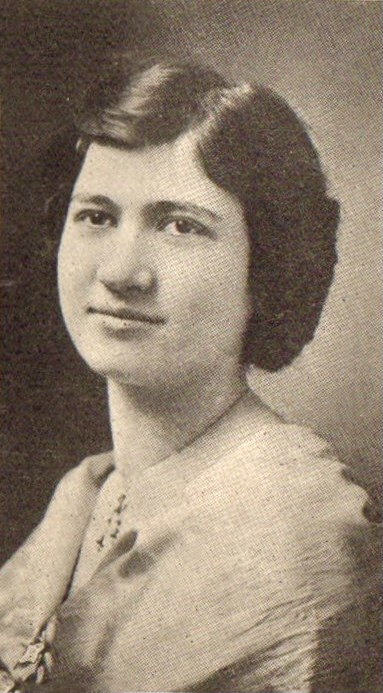
Nettie Ottenberg

- Bull Allen, 65, Australian soldier and a recipient of the United States' Silver Star
- Åke Andersson, 63, Swedish ice hockey, football and bandy player
- Jacob Burck, 75, Polish-born Jewish-American painter, sculptor, and award-winning editorial cartoonist.
- Tibor Fazekas, 89, Hungarian water polo player
- Al Hayse, 61, American jazz trombonist
- Dave Malarcher, 87, American third baseman in Negro league baseball
- Josiah Lewis Morgan, 88 or 89, Welsh flying ace in the Royal Air Force
- Nettie Ottenberg, 95, American social worker
- Leonardo Savioli, 65, Italian architect and painter
- Sejr Volmer-Sørensen, 68, Danish lyricist, actor, director and television host
- Elli Ylimaa, 81, Finnish actress
- Mohamed Salamah, 82–83, Egyptian Quran reciter and teacher.

=== 12 ===
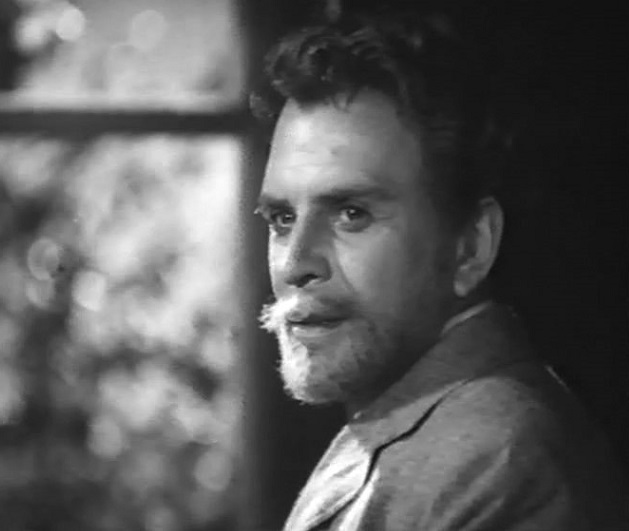
Aleksandr Borisov

- Walter Boas, 78, German-Australian metallurgist
- Aleksandr Borisov, 77, Soviet actor, film director, screenwriter, and singer, he was named People's Artist of the USSR (1951) and Hero of Socialist Labour (1981)
- Hardy Cross Dillard, 79, American jurist who served as a judge on the International Court of Justice
- Pjetër Gjoka, 69, Albanian film and theatre actor
- Fred Halsey Kraege, 83, American politician
- Hubert Lanz, 85, German general during the Second World War
- Wear Schoonover, 72, American college football player
- Ronald Bodley Scott, 75, English haematologist and expert on therapy for leukemia and lymphoma
- Humphrey Searle, 66, English composer and writer on music who was considered an authority on Franz Liszt
- Alexander Zaytsev, 78, Russian painter

=== 13 ===
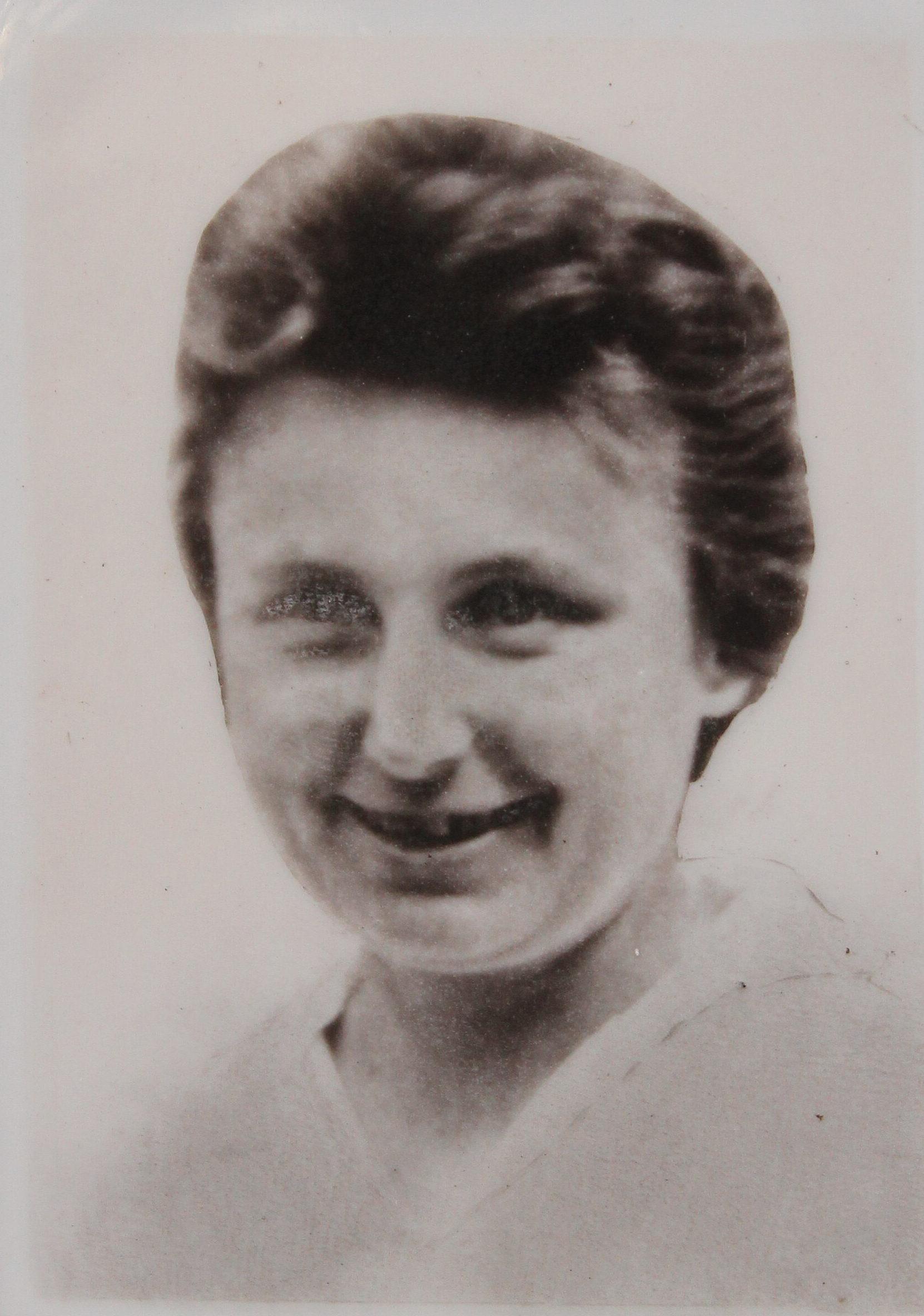
Věra Suková

- Akhsarbek Abaev, 58, Ossetian Red Army Sergeant and Hero of the Soviet Union
- Despina Achladiotou, 92, Greek patriot
- Claude Bourque, 67, Canadian ice hockey goaltender
- Gara Garayev, 64, Soviet Azerbaijani composer
- Zhamyangiyn Lhagvasuren, 70, Mongolian military officer and politician
- Jim Lookabaugh, 79, American football player and coach
- Frank Monte, 50, American mobster, murdered
- Sal Pace, 75, American jazz clarinetist and saxophonist
- Renzo Rossellini, 74, Italian composer
- Věra Suková, 50, Czech tennis player

=== 14 ===
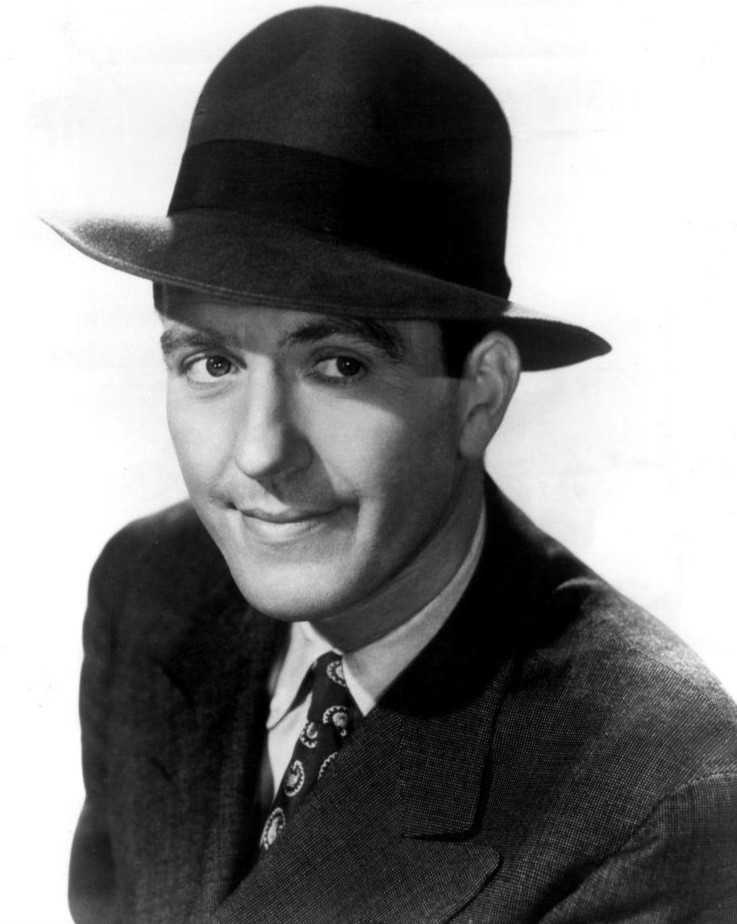
Hugh Beaumont

- Hugh Beaumont, 73, American actor, short story writer, and scriptwriter for both radio and television, primarily known for his portrayal of the wise small-town father Ward Cleaver on the television sitcom Leave It to Beaver, and the private detective Michael Shayne in a series of low-budget crime films released by the Producers Releasing Corporation (PRC) from 1946 until 1947, heart attack
- Joe Davidson, 79, American football player
- Jean Derbès, 45, French composer, pianist, and music critic
- Harry Englehart, 58, American politician and lawyer from Pennsylvania
- Bruce Graeme, 81, British mystery writer
- Marcel-Henri Jaspar, 80, Belgian lawyer, politician, and diplomat
- Fred Saidy, 75, American playwright and screenwriter

=== 15 ===
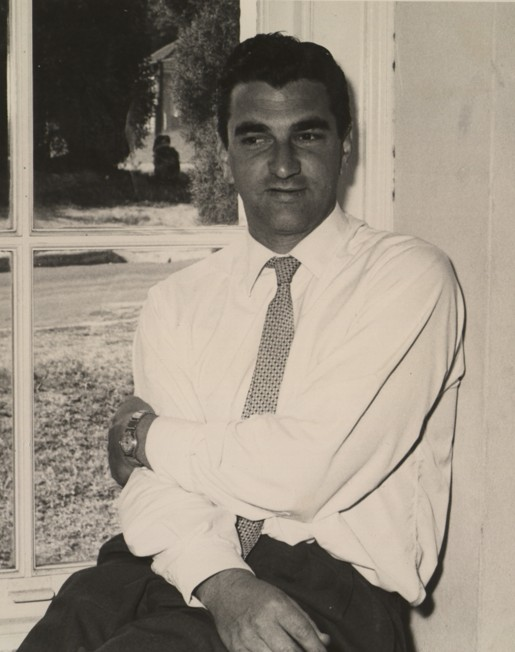
Stuart Thomas Butler

- Jenő Ádám, 85, Hungarian music educator, composer, and conductor
- Stuart Thomas Butler, 55, Australian nuclear physicist who served as director of the Australian Atomic Energy Commission
- Loren G. McCollom, 68, American fighter pilot during World War II and a major general in the United States Air Force
- Birch Monroe, 80, American old time and early bluegrass fiddler, bassist, dancer, founding member of the Monroe brothers
- John Newbold, 29, English professional Grand Prix motorcycle road racer
- Gordon Smiley, 36, American race car driver, killed in a single-car crash at the Indianapolis Motor Speedway. He was attempting to qualify for the 1982 Indianapolis 500, reportedly determined to break 200 mph (320 km/h) "or to die trying". Due to massive centrifugal force, his helmet was pulled from his head on impact, and he was scalped by the debris fence. Parts of his brain marked a trail on the asphalt. Smiley's death was the first at Indy since 1973, and to date, the last during a qualification attempt.
- Robert Arthur Sprecher, 64, United States circuit judge of the United States Court of Appeals for the Seventh Circuit.
- Jane Storm, 87, American screenwriter

=== 16 ===
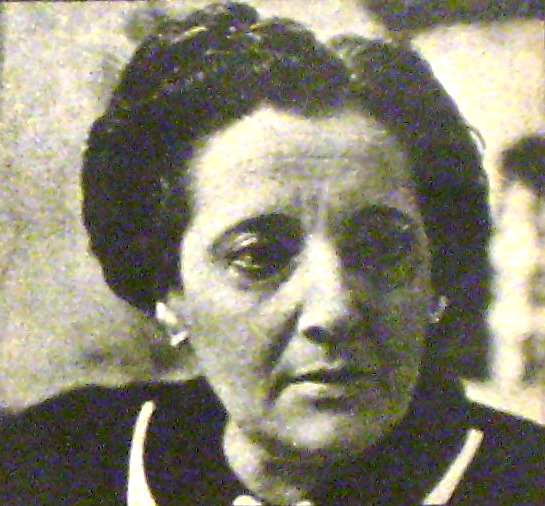
Nené Cascallar

- Nené Cascallar, 67, Argentine writer of radio plays and telenovelas
- Edward Clarke, 93, British modern pentathlon
- J. J. P. Corrigan, Republican lawyer from Ohio and associate justice of the Ohio Supreme Court
- Naoe Fushimi, 73, Japanese actress
- Sidney Hickox, 86, American film and television cinematographer
- Claude Jeantet, 79, French journalist and far-right politician
- William Harry Jellema, 89, American philosopher and the founder of Calvin University's philosophy department
- Alfonso Marotta, 58, Italian modern pentathlete
- Ivan Mihailov, 85, Bulgarian communist politician, military officer and statesman
- Emili Salut Payà, 63, Catalan trumpeter and composer
- Feliciano Peña, 67, Mexican painter and engraver
- Leigh Snowden, 52, American actress for Universal Pictures and nightclub singer, cancer
- M. Harvey Taylor, 105, American politician from Pennsylvania

=== 17 ===
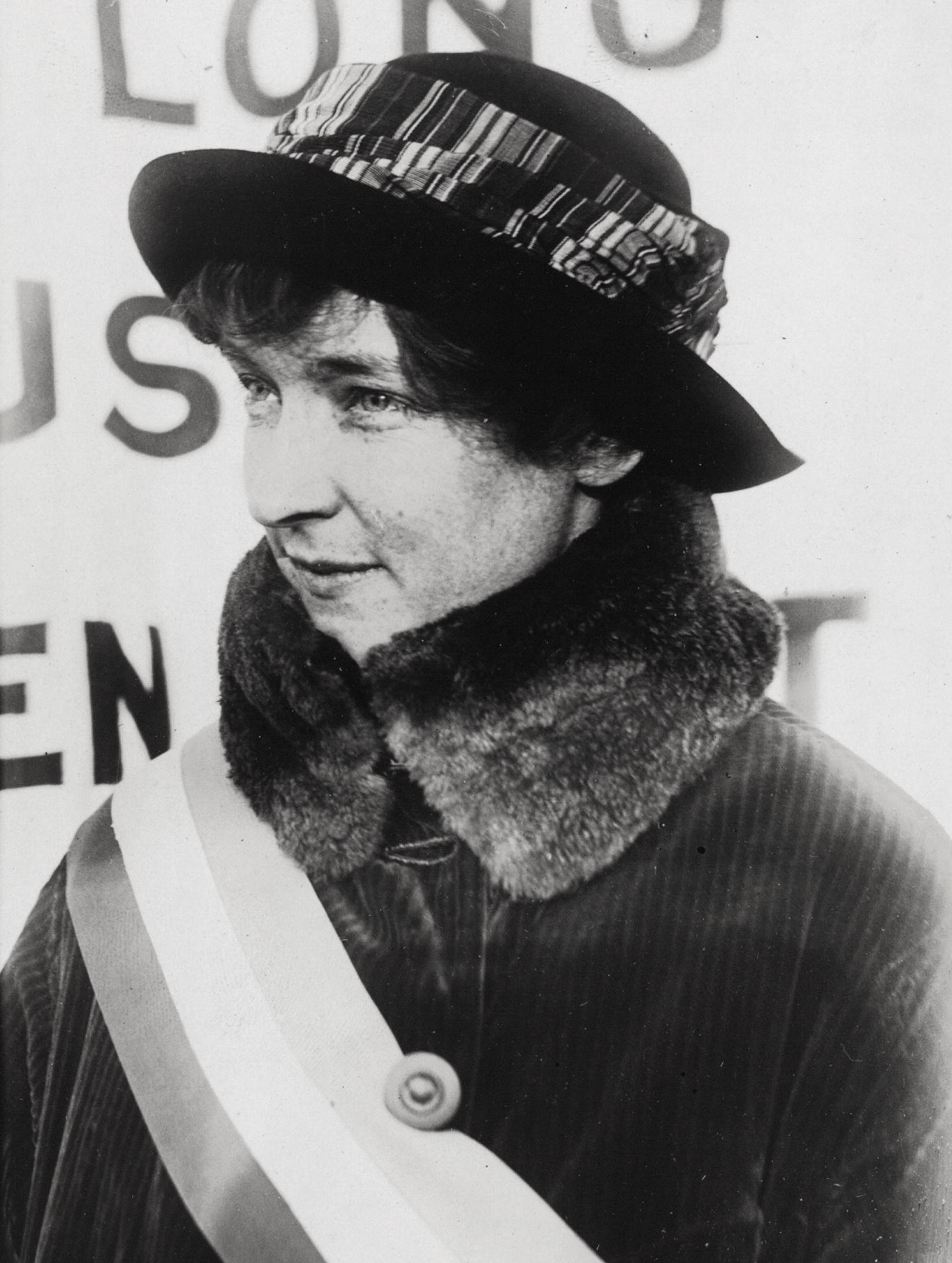
Hazel Hunkins Hallinan

- Don R. Berlin, 83, American military aircraft designer and aircraft industry executive
- Peter Boardman, 31, English mountaineer and author
- Charles Griffiths, 78, Australian politician
- Hazel Hunkins Hallinan, 91, American women's rights activist, journalist, and suffragist
- Väinö Heusala, 68, Finnish sports shooter
- Israel Levitan, 69, American abstract expressionist sculptor
- Ester Mazzoleni, 99, Italian operatic soprano and voice teacher
- John O'Donovan, 74, Irish politician
- Joe Tasker, 34, British climber
- Dixie Walker, 71, American professional baseball player, coach, scout and minor league manager

=== 18 ===
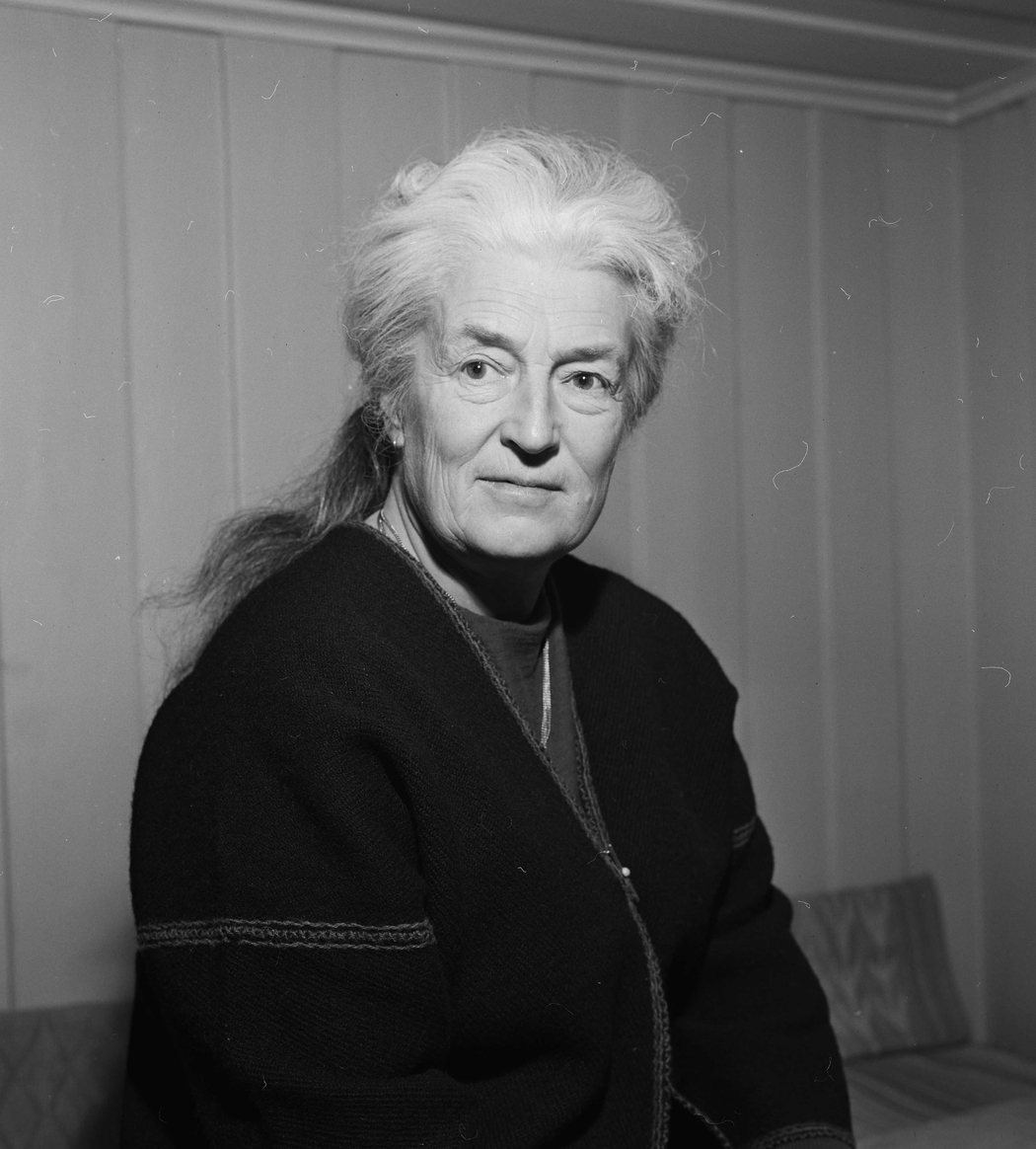
Sigrun Berg

- Sigrun Berg, 81, Norwegian weaver and textile designer
- Amoz Gibson, 63, Baháʼí Faith religious leader
- Lajos Kiss, 82, Hungarian ethnomusicologist, music educator, academic administrator, conductor, editor, and folk-song collector
- Frankie Klick, 75, American boxer
- Ariadna Mikeshina, 81, Russian-born pianist and composer
- Ralph Reader, 78, British actor, theatrical producer and songwriter
- Kemparaj Urs, 65, Indian actor, director, and producer
- Gordon Wood, 50, Irish rugby union footballer

=== 19 ===
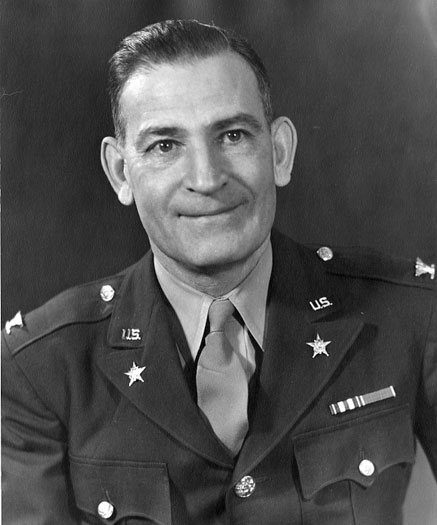
Lee S. Gerow

- Willem Bokhoven, 81, Dutch water polo player
- C. Violet Butler, 98, British social researcher and educator
- Lee S. Gerow, 91, brigadier general in the United States Army
- Elwyn Jones, 59, Welsh television writer, producer, and true crime novelist, Head of Drama (Series) at the BBC from 1963 until 1966, he created or co-created the television series Z-Cars, Softly, Softly, Softly, Softly: Task Force, Barlow at Large/Barlow, Jack the Ripper and Second Verdict, sudden death at his home, no known cause of death
- Reinhard Karl, 35, German mountaineer, photographer, and writer
- Pavel Grigoryevich Kuznetsov, 80, Soviet Army lieutenant general during WWII
- Frank Winnold Prentice, 93, British merchant seaman who survived the sinking of the Titanic
- Corbet Woodall, 53, English newsreader for the British Broadcasting Corporation (BBC), host for the shows Look East, Any Questions?, and Any Answers?, he frequently played roles as a television newsreader or as an announcer in both films and television series, increasingly disabled by rheumatoid arthritis since the late 1960s

=== 20 ===
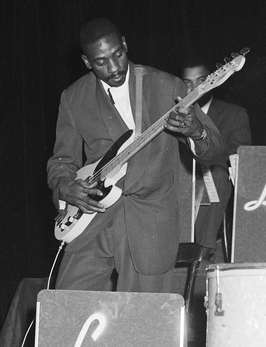
Monk Montgomery

- Elisa Hall de Asturias, 82, Guatemalan writer and intellectual
- John Philip Falter, 72, American artist best known for his many cover paintings for The Saturday Evening Post
- Greene Farmer, 62, American baseball outfielder
- Jan Gregoor, 68, Dutch painter and art educator
- Franciszek Mientki, 68, Polish priest, missionary of the Congregation of the Holy Spirit, chaplain of the Polish Armed Forces and lieutenant-colonel in the Polish Army
- Shmuel Mikunis, 78, Israeli politician
- Monk Montgomery, 60, jazz bassist
- Phaedrig O'Brien, 17th Baron Inchiquin, 82, British geologist and peer
- Zirl A. Palmer, 62, African-American businessman and activist from Kentucky
- Edmundo Searle, 89, Chilean cartoonist
- John Stephenson, 74, English first-class cricketer
- Leo Taylor, 81, American baseball player
- Hubert Thorn, 73, English cricketer
- Merle Tuve, 80, American geophysicist

=== 21 ===
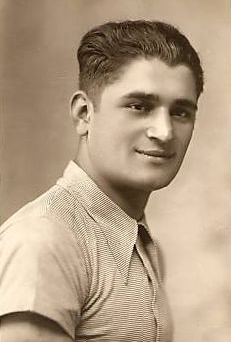
Marco Cimatti

- Marco Cimatti, 70, Italian cyclist and Olympic gold medalist
- Jean Coleman, 73, British Special Operations Executive during World War II
- Jim Collins, 60, Canadian curler
- Holger Crafoord, 73, Swedish industrialist and patron
- Eilís Nic Eachnaidh, 84, Irish republican activist and nationalist
- Barbara Fitzgerald, 70, Irish novelist
- Nigel Gosling, 73, British art and dance critic and author.
- Olive A. Greeley, 80, American field director and bolometer assistant for the Smithsonian Astrophysical Observatory
- Mieczysław Łoza, 66, Polish actor
- Giovanni Muzio, 89, Italian architect
- Ray Nash, 77, American art historian
- Arthur Norrington, 82, British publisher and university president
- Paul A. Putnam, 78, Marine Corps Fighter Squadron VMF-211
- Max Stern, 83, American businessman, investor, and philanthropist who established and built the Hartz Mountain Corporation.

=== 22 ===
Lynn de Silva

- Louis Balsan, 70, French bobsledder
- Ronnie Elliott, 71, American sculptor, collagist, and printmaker
- T. J. Fowler, 71, American jazz and jump blues musician
- Robert Kent Gooch, 88, American football player and political scientist
- Athol Richardson, 85, Australian politician and judge
- Princess Princep Shah of Nepal, 52, wife of Prince Himalaya of Nepal
- Afanasy Shilin, 57, Soviet artillery officer
- Lynn de Silva, 62, Sri Lankan theologian and Methodist minister
- Cevdet Sunay, 83, Turkish politician and military officer who served as the president of Turkey from 1966 to 1973

=== 23 ===
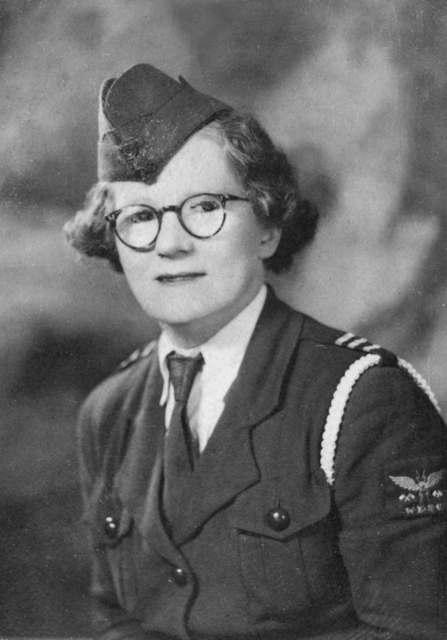
Florence Violet McKenzie

- Thomas Dalling, 90, Scottish veterinarian
- Karl Fochler, 84, Austrian actor
- Enzo Galbiati, 85, Italian soldier and fascist politician
- Louis Gérardin, 69, French track cyclist.
- Geoffrey Lowndes, 84, English first-class cricketer
- John D. MacCallum, 63, Canadian politician
- Ernest McGirr, 95, politician in Manitoba, Canada
- Florence Violet McKenzie, 91, Australia's first female electrical engineer and founder of the Women's Emergency Signalling Corps
- Angus Nicoson, 62, American football, basketball and baseball player and coach
- Marjorie Gordon Smart, 71, British, Canadian and Australian diplomat
- Harry C. Solomon, 92, American neuropsychiatrist

=== 24 ===
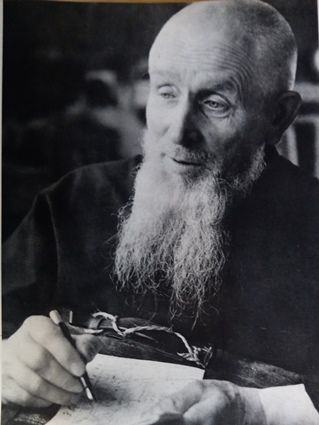
Zeno Żebrowski

- Dan Bailey, 78, American conservationist
- Raffaele Calabria, 75, Italian Catholic bishop
- Edward T. Conroy, 53, state senator from Maryland. Having lost his left hand in the Korean War and suffered severe skin burns, he was a recipient of the Purple Heart and the Silver Star. He became an advocate for the disabled.
- Mary Campbell Dawbarn, 80, Australian biochemist and nutritional physiologist
- Mikael Gam, 81, Danish educator and independent politician
- Gene Graham, 57, American journalist and educator who was a co-winner of the Pulitzer Prize for National Reporting for his work with the Nashville Tennessean
- Richard Hall, 78, English composer and music educator
- Sidney H. Haughton, 94, English-born South African paleontologist and geologist
- Florence Hay, 49, player in the All-American Girls Professional Baseball League
- Zakariyya Kandhlawi, 84, mid-twentieth-century traditionalist Sunni scholar
- Tauno Palo, 73, Finnish actor, singer, and chemist, he worked for the Finnish National Theatre
- Stanisława Perzanowska, 83, Polish actress, theater and film director, professor at the National Higher School of Theatre in Warsaw
- William Sheat, 83, New Zealand Member of Parliament for two Taranaki electorates
- Edward Tolhurst, 86, Australian cricketer
- Zeno Żebrowski, 84, Polish Roman Catholic missionary

=== 25 ===
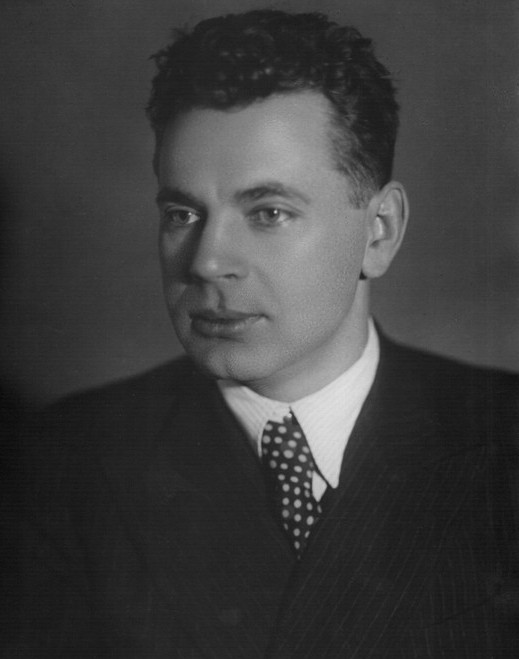
Nikolai Mikhailov

- Larry J. Blake, 68, American actor
- Larry Giovando, 77, Canadian politician
- Nikolai Mikhailov, 75, a Soviet politician, journalist, diplomat, Komsomol and Communist Party official
- Hermine Sterler, 88, German actress
- Richard Tomberg, 84, Estonian military Major General

=== 26 ===
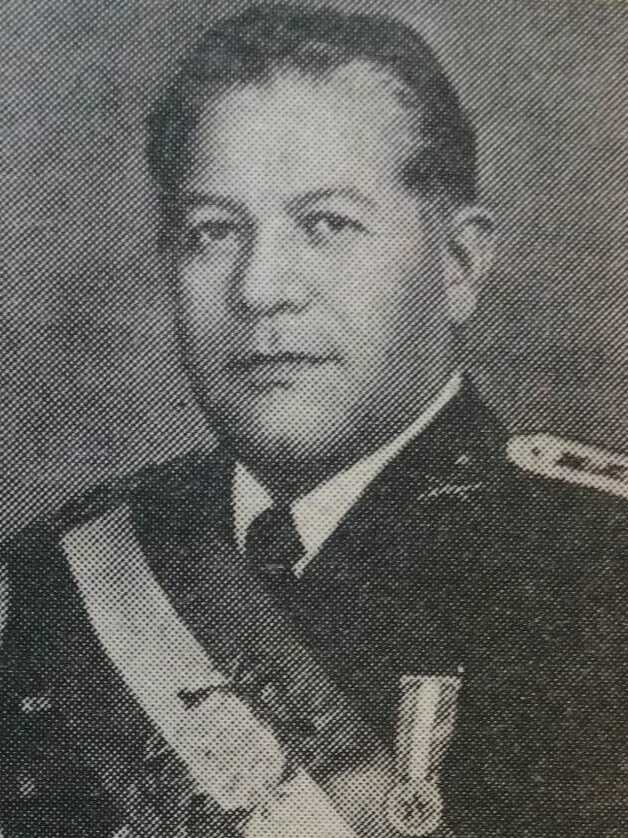
Guillermo Flores Avendaño

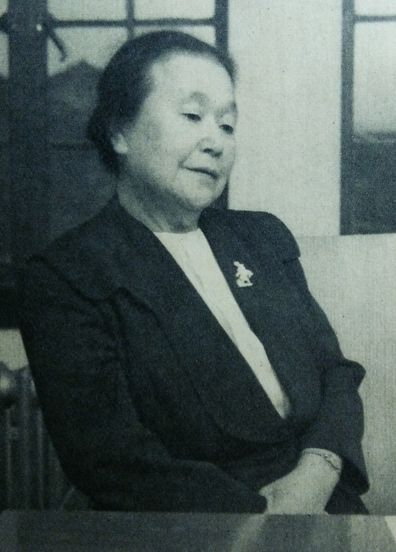
Tamaki Uemura

- Robert Armitage, 77, British recipients of the George Cross and George Medal
- Magele Ate, 60, Western Samoan politician
- Guillermo Flores Avendaño, 87, Guatemalan military officer, he served as the acting president of Guatemala from 1957 until 1958, with the start of his term following the annulled results of the 1957 Guatemalan general election, his term ended shortly after the 1958 Guatemalan general election, he oversaw the inauguration of a new president
- Richard Battle, 75, English plastic surgeon.
- Semra Ertan, 25, Turkish migrant worker and writer in Germany
- Giovanni Folcarelli, 55, Lieutenant Governor of the U.S. State of Rhode Island
- Emma Horion, 92, German representative of Catholic Women's Welfare and Christian feminist
- Nanny Larsén-Todsen, 97, Swedish dramatic soprano
- Beirne Lay Jr., 72, American aviation writer, Hollywood screenwriter, and combat veteran of the U.S. Army Air Forces during World War II, cancer
- Sally Lippman, 81, American lawyer and regular dancer at the disco of Studio 54
- Barry J. Mailloux, Canadian computer scientist
- Karl-Conrad Mecke, 87, WWII German Navy officer and recipient of the Knight's Cross of the Iron Cross
- Lee Shih-ke, 55, Chinese criminal and murderer
- Tamaki Uemura, 91, YWCA executive, pacifist, and Christian pastor in Japan
- Bessie Williamson, 71, Scottish distillery manager
- Ernst Zipperer, 94, German painter and printmaker

=== 27 ===
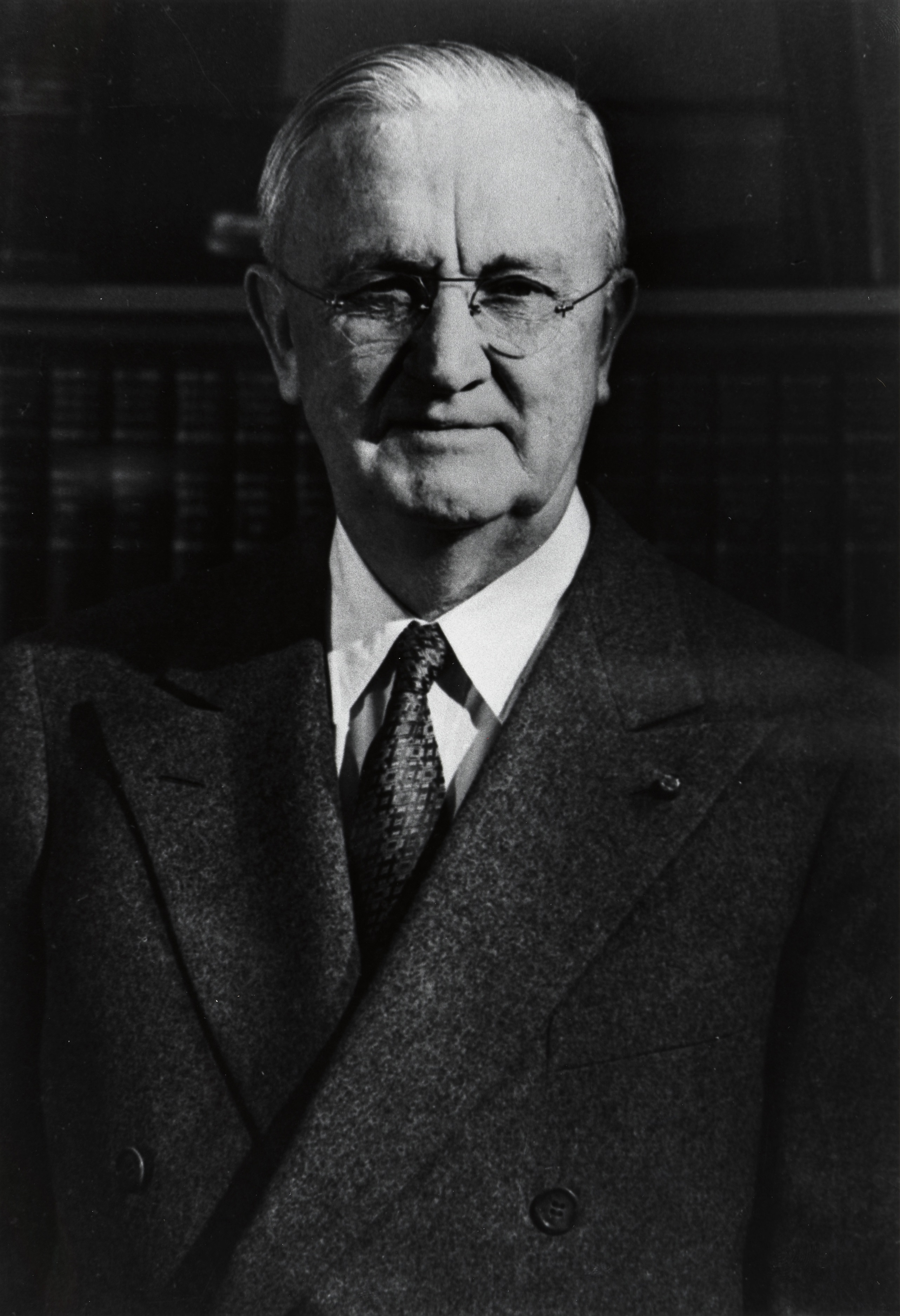
Thomas B. McCabe

- Éric Laborey, 31, French actor and director
- Thomas B. McCabe, 88, American businessman who served as the 8th chairman of the Federal Reserve
- Maud Julia Augusta Russell, 90, British socialite and art patron
- Noel Rogers, 58, Australian cricketer

=== 28 ===
- Boris Chirkov, 80, Soviet and Russian actor
- Carl Henry Clerk, 87, Ghanaian agricultural educationist, administrator, journalist, editor and church minister
- Gerhard Conrad, 87, German general in the Luftwaffe of Nazi Germany during World War II. He was a recipient of the Knight's Cross of the Iron Cross.
- Harry Crabtree, 76, English cricketer
- Roberto Estévez, 25, Argentine Army officer
- Alexander Hurd, 71, Canadian speed skater and Olympic medalist
- H. Jones, 42, British military officer, he served as the commanding officer of the 2nd Battalion, Parachute Regiment during the Falklands War, he was killed in the Battle of Goose Green, while leading a charge against entrenched Argentine positions. Jones fell metres short of the trench, shot in the back and the groin, and died within minutes.
- Jurica Lakić, 29, Croatian handball player
- Arthur Lemon, 77, Welsh rugby union player
- Wiesław Maniak, 44, Polish sprinter and Olympic medalist
- Christian Markersen, 73, Danish middle-distance runner who competed at the 1932 Summer Olympics
- Carlo Miranda, 69, Italian mathematician
- Harry Van Surdam, 100, American football player, coach, official, musician, composer, bandleader, and superintendent of the El Paso Military Institute
- Herbert A. Wagner, 82, Austrian scientist who developed numerous innovations in the fields of aerodynamics
- Mathias Zahradka, 70, Austrian weightlifter who competed in the 1936 Summer Olympics

=== 29 ===
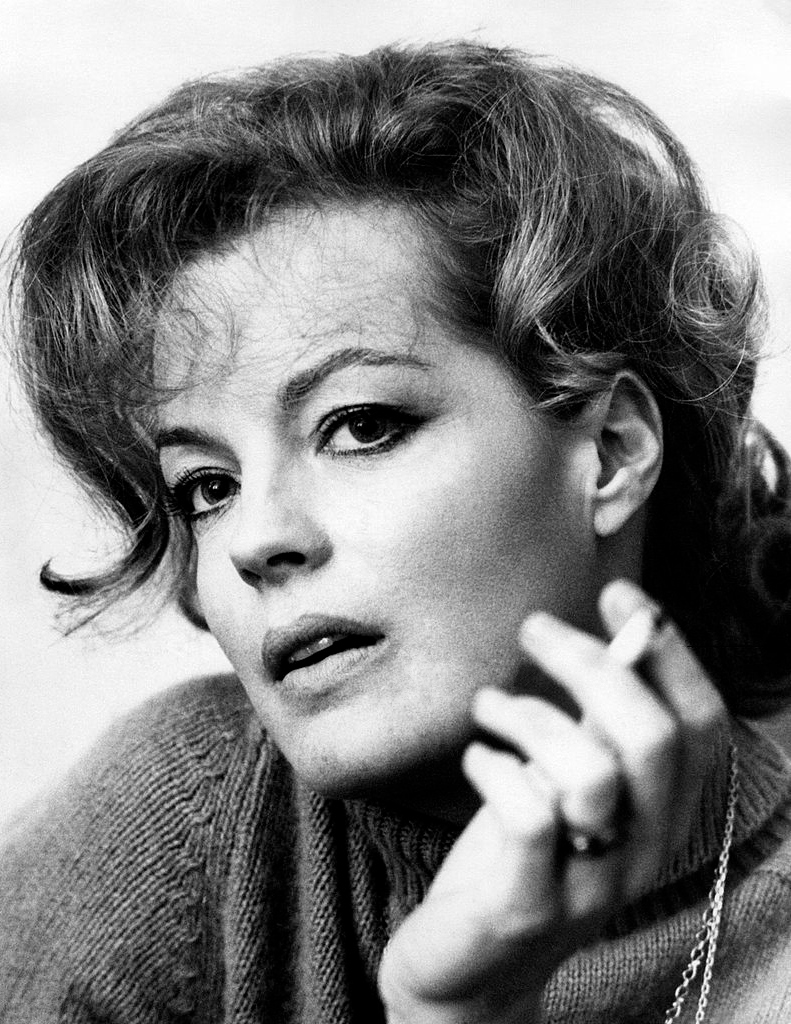
Romy Schneider

- Auro de Moura Andrade, 66, Brazilian lawyer and politician
- Rudy Debnar, 66, American basketball player
- Henri Dulieux, 85, French fencer and Olympic medalist
- Henri Guidet, 70, French politician
- Walter Harzer, 69, German SS commander during the Nazi era
- Erv Palica, 54, American baseball player
- Babe Parnell, 81, American football player
- Romy Schneider, 43, German and French actress, she started her film career in her teen years by performing in the German Heimatfilm genre, she became a cult figure with her starring role as Empress Elisabeth of Austria in the Sissi trilogy in the mid-1950s, death by cardiac arrest, attributed to complications from a kidney surgery which she had months before her death. Posthumously, the Sissi trilogy remains one of the most successful examples of the German-language cinema, the trilogy is used as a popular Christmas television special, and is shown with some regularity on channels in German-speaking countries, in Hungary, and in Italy.
- Phil White, 82, American football player and physician

=== 30 ===
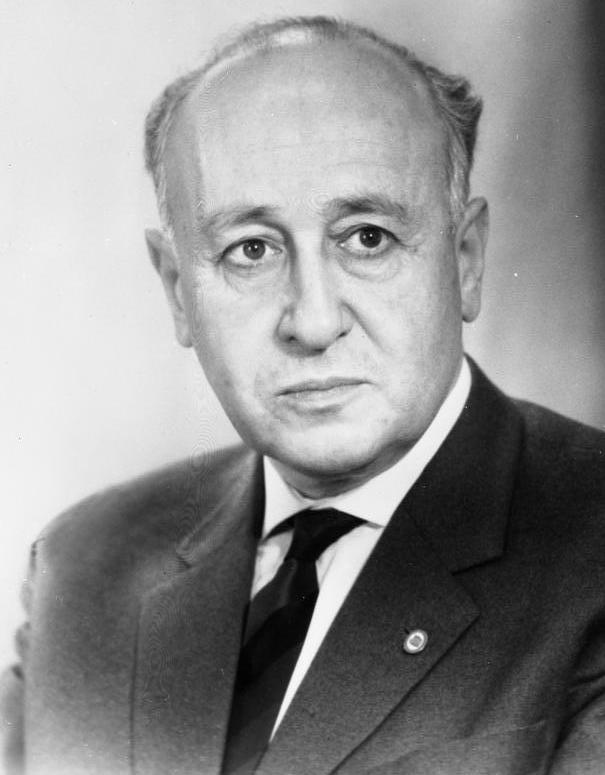
Albert Norden

- Husein Đozo, 69, Bosnian Islamic theologian and activist
- Charlie Gooch, 79, American professional baseball player
- Hubert Lindop, 74, English cricketer
- Albert Norden, 77, German communist politician, he was the editor of the newspaper Die Rote Fahne ('Red Flag') from 1931 until 1933, he served as a member of the Central Committee of the Socialist Unity Party of Germany (SED), and as a member of the party's Politburo, he published the Braunbuch ('Brown Book', 1965), in which he accused over 1,900 politicians, state officials and other prominent persons in West Germany of having worked for the Nazi regime in the past. The book became a reference in the West German New Left, which increasingly had begun to question the official historiography on the Nazi period. The book highlighted the past political activities of 21 Ministers and state secretaries, 100 admirals and generals, 828 judges or state lawyers and high law officers, 245 officials of the Foreign Office and of embassies and consulates in leading position, 297 high police officers and officers of the Verfassungsschutz
- Johnny O'Connor, 90, American baseball catcher who played briefly for the Chicago Cubs
- Georg Stibi, 80, German diplomat, journalist, and politician

=== 31 ===
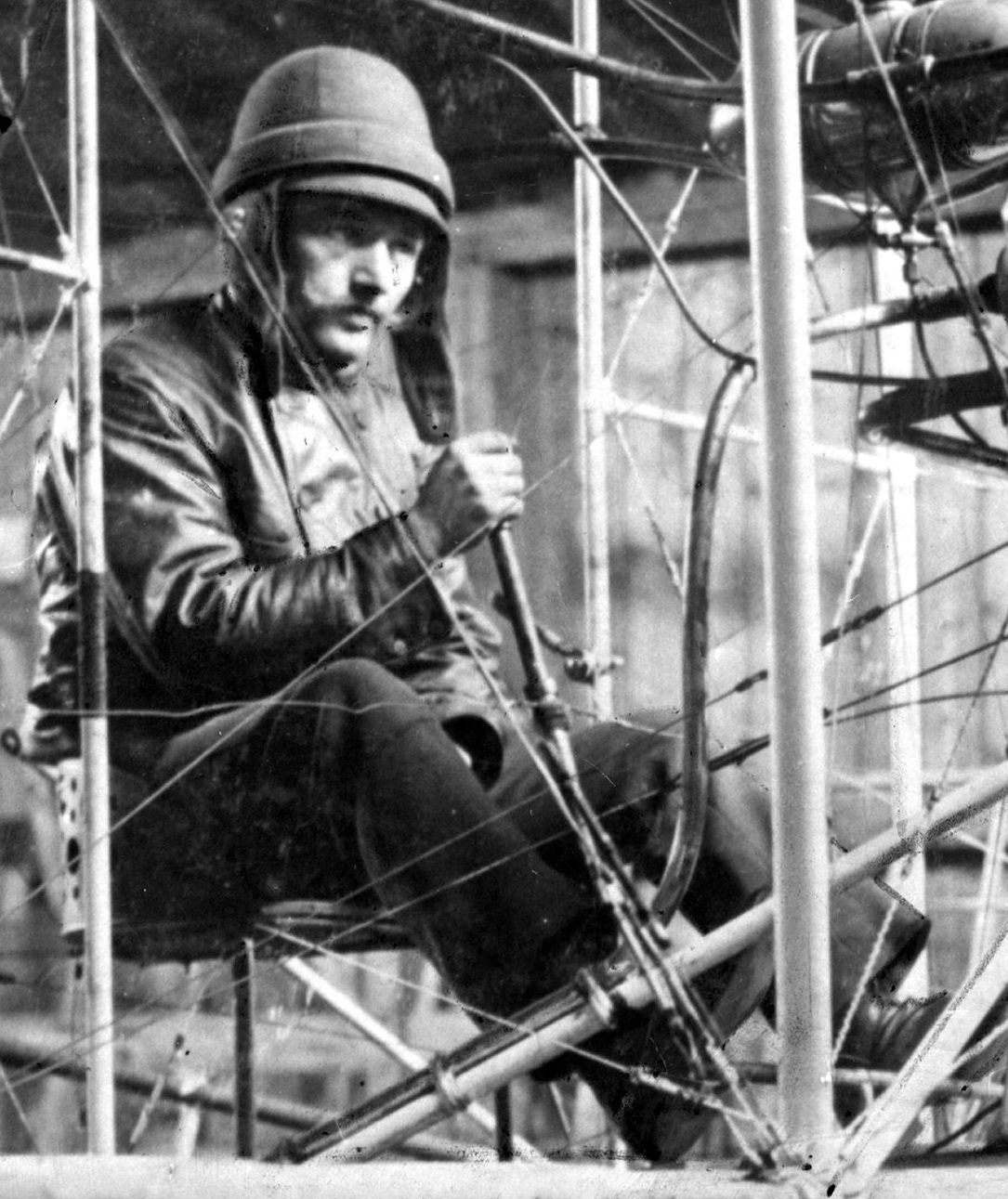
Czesław Zbierański

- Nafis Ahmad, 70 or 71, Bangladeshi geographer and educator
- Harry Barnes, 67, Scottish artist and director of the Glasgow School of Art
- Donald Don, 81, Australian rules footballer
- Carlo Mauri, 52, Italian mountaineer and explorer
- Birgit Skiöld, 59, Swedish master printmaker and modernist artist
- Czesław Zbierański, 96, Polish engineer, pioneer of Polish aviation, major of Polish Army
- Juan Antonio de Zunzunegui, 80, Spanish novelist and short story writer
