= Ernie Watson =

Ernie Watson may refer to:

- Ernie Watson (footballer, born 1896) (1896–1976), Australian rules footballer for Fitzroy
- Ernie Watson (footballer, born 1908) (1908–1982), Australian rules footballer for Essendon
