= Guidet =

Guidet is a surname. Notable people with the surname include:

- Abel Guidet (1890–1944), French politician
- Henri Guidet (1912–1982), French politician
