= Lindop =

Lindop is a surname. Notable people with the surname include:

- Audrey Erskine Lindop (1920–1986), English fiction writer
- Fred Lindop (1938–2023), British rugby league referee
- Grevel Lindop (born 1948), English poet
- Hubert Lindop (1907–1982), English cricketer
- Patricia Lindop (1930–2018), British professor of radiation biology
