= Noel Rogers =

Australian cricketer

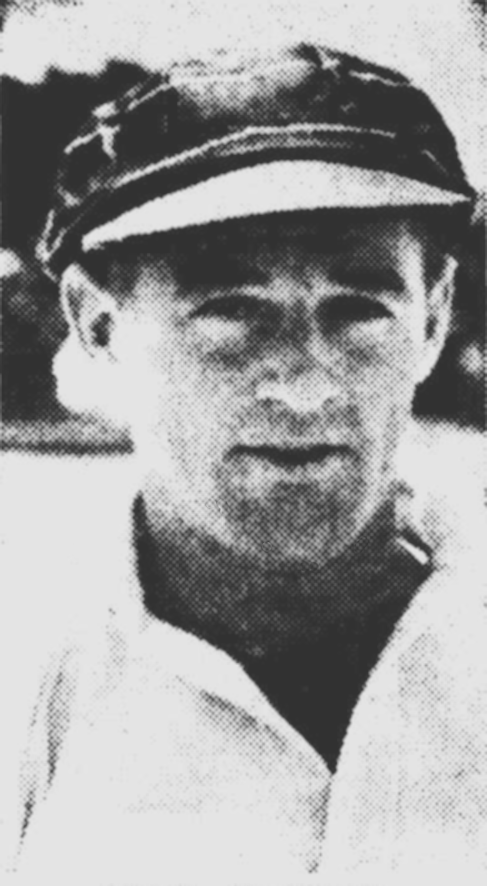

Personal information
- Born: 28 December 1923; Brisbane, Queensland, Australia
- Died: 27 May 1982 (aged 58); Annerley, Queensland, Australia
- Source: Cricinfo, 6 October 2020

Noel Rogers (28 December 1923 – 27 May 1982) was an Australian cricketer. He played in three first-class matches for Queensland in 1947/48.

== See also ==
- List of Queensland first-class cricketers
