= Edward Clarke (pentathlete) =

British modern pentathlete

Personal information
- Born: 1 October 1888
- Died: 16 May 1982 (aged 93)

Sport
- Sport: Modern pentathlon

Edward Clarke (1 October 1888 – 16 May 1982) was a British modern pentathlete. He competed at the 1920 Summer Olympics.
