= Zirl A. Palmer =

American businessman and civil rights activist (1920–1982)

Dr. Zirl A. Palmer
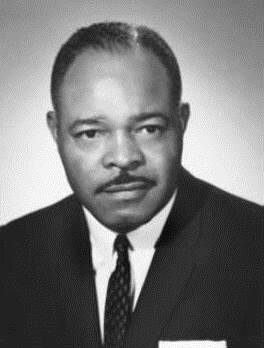
- Born: December 11, 1919; Bluefield, West Virginia, U.S.
- Died: May 20, 1982 (aged 62); Fayette County, Kentucky, U.S.
- Education: Bluefield State College; Howard University; Xavier University
- Occupations: pharmacist; businessperson; activist
- Board member of: University of Kentucky Board of Trustees
- Spouse: Marian Elspy Sidney
- Children: Andrea Palmer

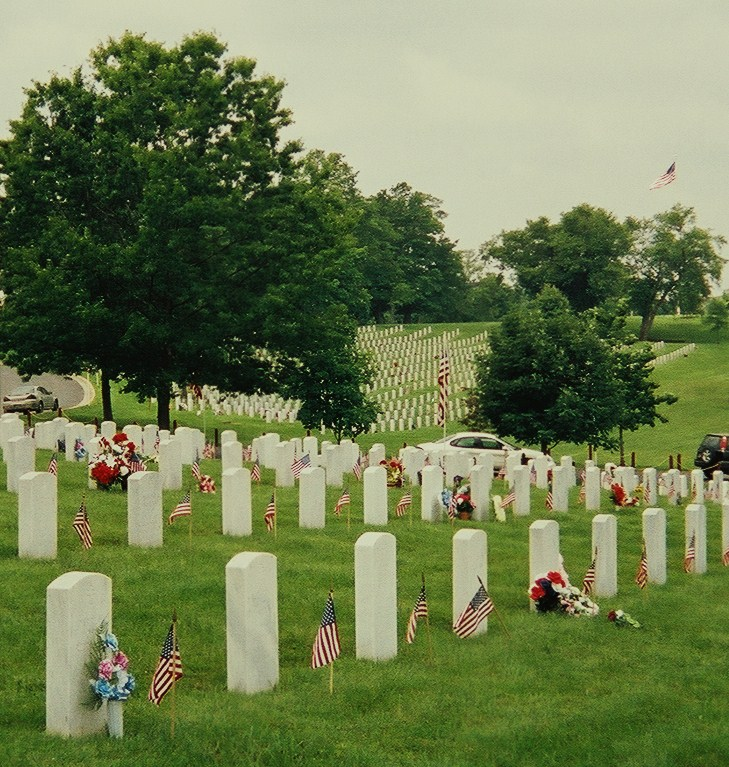
Palmer's place of burial is Camp Nelson National Cemetery

Zirl Augustus Palmer (December 11, 1919 – May 20, 1982) was an African-American businessman and activist in Lexington, Kentucky. He opened Palmer's Pharmacy in 1952 in an old building at Fifth and Race Street. He was involved in the city's desegregation and first Black board member of the University of Kentucky Board of Trustees. He and his family were the target of a Ku Klux Klan bombing in 1968.

At the time of Palmer's move to Lexington, the city had an established group of Black professionals, among them were nine medical doctors, four dentists, and two pharmacists.

Due to segregation, soda fountains at the existing pharmacies were off limits to Blacks. Although Palmer first had difficulty in locating an ice cream company willing to do business, Dixie Ice Cream Co. agreed, and his soda fountain luncheonette grew in popularity.

Palmer understood the need to draw customers into the store In addition to the soda fountain as profit margins from medications was low. He annually crafted a Palmer Pharmacy calendar with photographs of the local Black community which became very popular.

== Early life and education ==
Zirl Augustus Palmer was born December 11, 1919, in Bluefield, West Virginia, to parents Rev. James Augustus Palmer and Lola Allen Palmer. Zirl was educated at Bluefield State College and Howard University, both among Historically Black Colleges and Universities. Since Blacks were barred from the West Virginia professional schools, he found an alternative at Xavier University of Louisiana College of Pharmacy in New Orleans. He sought the financial assistance from his home state, getting train fare and partial tuition paid.

== Career ==
In 1951, Palmer moved to Lexington, Kentucky and opened his first pharmacy, Palmer Pharmacy, in the East End, a traditionally Black neighborhood. It was a franchise of Rexall, the company's first Black owned store. He was actively engaged in mentoring neighborhood youth, employing them and referring them to other businesses. In 1961, Palmer constructed the mid-century modern building in the West End of Lexington to house his 2nd pharmacy, with two doctors, and a lawyer, opening Palmer's Pharmacy, Luncheonette, and Doctor's Office in 1961. The opening was reported in Jet Magazine in December 1961.

Palmer was instrumental in founding a student branch of the American Pharmaceutical Association at Xavier serving as the first president. He also was a writer for the student newspaper, the Xavier Herald.

His civic involvement included the National Association for the Advancement of Colored People, the Chamber of Commerce, and Planned Parenthood. At his church, Main Street Baptist, he organized a health care program. Palmer was one of the first members of the Kentucky Commission on Human Rights which is charged with enforcement authority. An organizer of Community Action, he was the first Black member of the Optimist Club and Big Brothers.

=== Bombing and retirement ===
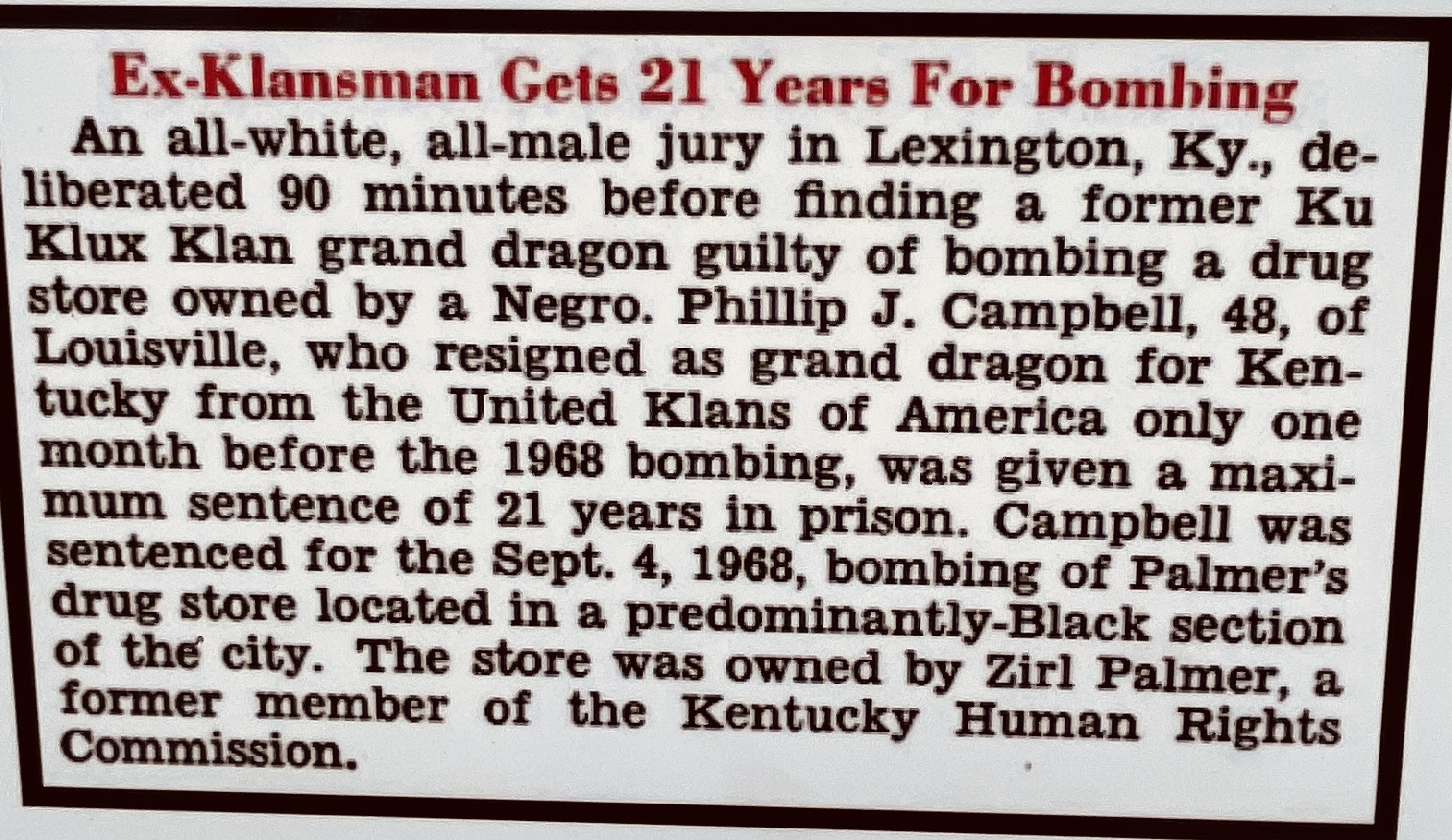
Report from Jet Magazine July 23, 1970, of KKK member conviction of the 1968 bombing of building owned by Zirl A. Palmer

Palmer opened a second store in 1966 on Georgetown Street, which was the site of the September 4, 1968, KKK bombing. The store was destroyed and damaged three others in the West End Plaza. Eight people were injured. Palmer, his wife, and four-year-old daughter, Andrea, were hospitalized after being trapped under the rubble for hours.

In 1970, Klansman Phillip J. Campbell of New Albany, Indiana, was convicted of this crime after a 90-minute deliberation by an all-white, all-male jury and sentenced to 21 years in prison. He also pleaded guilty to a car bombing in Louisville, Kentucky. Following the bombing, he is quoted as saying that to protect his family, he retired and sold his businesses.

Palmer continued his involvement in the community, including the UK Board of Trustees (1972–1979) to which he was appointed by Governor Wendell Ford. His Fifth and Race building is now the property of city government, which once considered razing the building. However, activists and historic preservationists have fought to allocate funds to preserve the building. An effort is underway to place the building on the National Register of Historic Places.

== Personal life and death ==
Palmer was married to Marian Elspy Sidney of Cartersville, Georgia. Both Palmer and his wife were veterans of World War II. He achieved the U.S. Army rank of Technician 5.

Palmer and his wife are both buried in Camp Nelson National Cemetery, Nicholasville, KY, Section H Site 513.

== Legacy ==
In October 2022, Palmer was honored by being included in a mural, Standing Tall and Proud, on the Tazewell County Courthouse in Tazewell, Virginia. Artist Ellen Elmes depicts eleven African Americans with ties to this Appalachian region. Among them are a representative coal miner and Lethia Cousins Fleming, a suffragist and teacher. The public art was inspired by a November 2020 advisory referendum which approved not relocating a Confederate statute by a 7–1 margin.

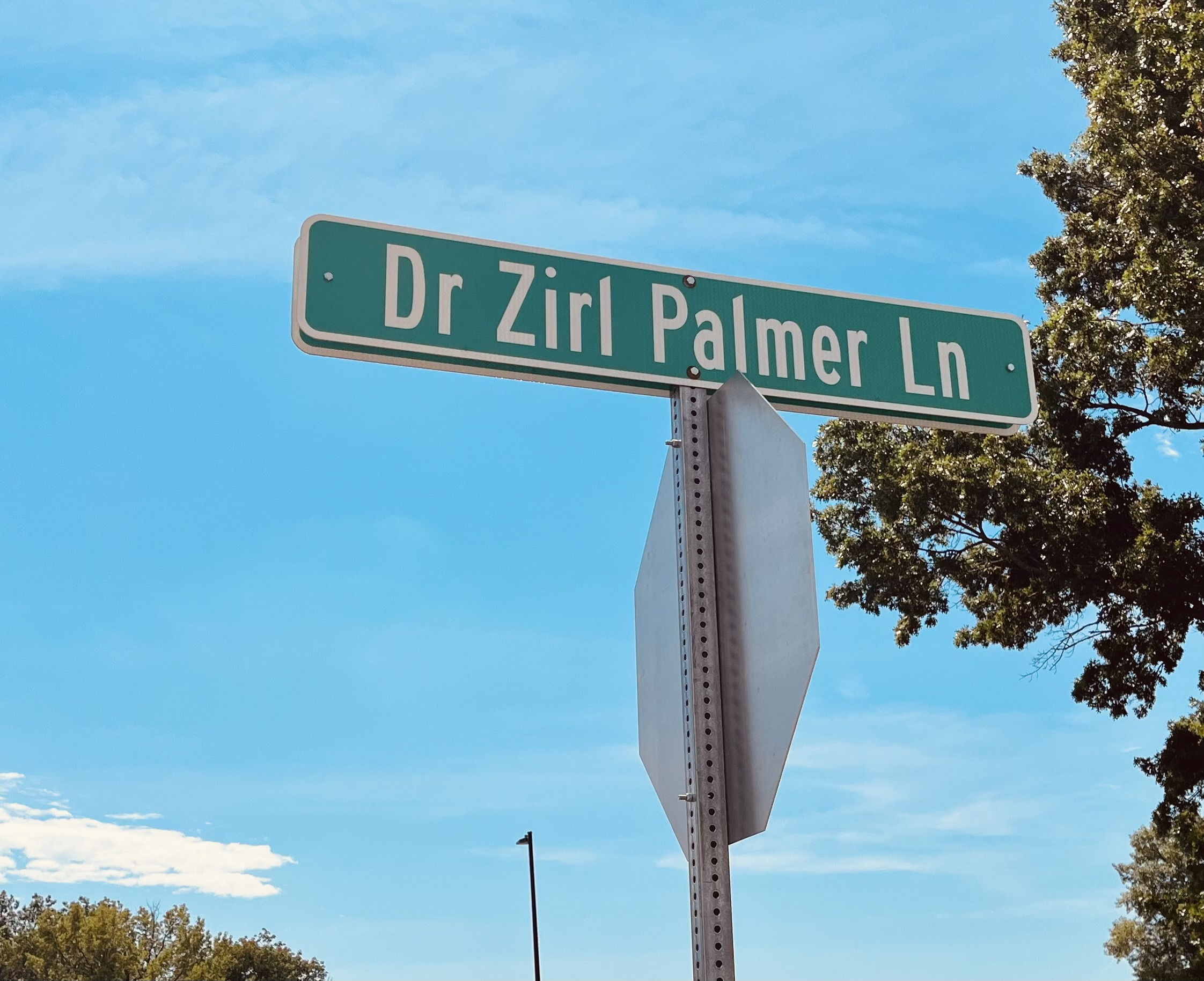
Street named for Dr, Palmer in 2022

In February 2023, an agreement with the city of Lexington, the United Way of the Bluegrass agreed to take over Palmer's first pharmacy property. The Marksbury Family WayPoint Center opened in May 2024. The centers are a United Way program which offer a one-stop shop of social services supported by a coalition of agencies to families in need of assistance.

A new road near Shropshire and Fifth Street was named in Palmer's honor in fall 2022. Planned construction for the road are a new Head Start center as well as 10 affordable single-family homes and a five-unit apartment building. The Lexington Housing Authority will construct the homes and the city has funded the road.
