= Emma Horion =

- Born: Emma Abeck; 8 September 1889; Cologne, Germany
- Died: 26 May 1982 (aged 92); Düsseldorf, West Germany
- Occupation(s): teacher women's rights activist pioneer of women's recuperation and convalescence
- Spouse(s): 1. Karl Kürten (?-1921); 2. Johannes Horion (1876−1933)
- Parent(s): Friedrich Abeck; Maria Kinghs

Emma Horion (born Emma Abeck: 8 September 1889 - 26 May 1982) was a German representative of Catholic Women's Welfare in the Christian Women's Movement. She dedicated her life to the German Catholic Women's Association, focusing her activities on mothers' recuperation and convalescence ("Müttererholung").

== Life ==
Emma Abeck was born in Cologne. Dr. Friedrich Abeck, her father, was a senior schools official ("Oberschulrat") locally. Her early training was as a teacher in middle and senior girls' schools. After qualifying in 1909 she took a job with a Düsseldorf's girls' middle school ("Städtischen Mädchen-Mittelschule an der Oststraße"). She was twice widowed: she married Karl Kürten in 1911 and then for a second time in 1928. Her second marriage was to Johannes Horion (1876−1933), an influential local politician.

At an early stage she became involved with the German Catholic Women's Association. She saw it as her task to back social equality for women through the women's movement of that time and, above all, through education. In or before 1916 she became a member of the executive for the Düsseldorf branch of the KDFB. In 1923 she became branch chair, a post she retained through till 1960. In addition, in 1925 she became KDFB chair for the entire Rhineland-Westphalia industrial region, and in 1928 a member of the KDFB national executive, based in Cologne. Her various leadership positions made her an influential force, particularly with respect to women's social and training work.

The well-being of mothers became a particular preoccupation. She therefore raised the profile of mothers' recuperation ("Müttererholung") and, from 1930, worked alongside the Catholic Working association for mother's welfare. She was having to operate in the context of the aftermath of the First World War, and the problems with which mothers had to engage during this period. Under exceptionally difficult conditions she had already, during the 1920s, organised the first initiatives in respect of mothers' recuperation ("Müttererholung"). After 1918, millions of men were war-invalids, to the point where many women became their families' main breadwinners. The war, and the period of hyperinflation (1914-1923) which accompanied and followed it, generated previously unknown levels of social distress for war orphans and war widows. In 1930 the Catholic Working association for mother's welfare ("Katholische Arbeitsgemeinschaft für Müttergenesung") was founded in the archdiocese of Cologne, shortly after which Horion created the "National Working Association for Mothers' Convalescence" ("Reichsarbeitsgemeinschaft für Müttererholung"). The Cologne-based organisation had two objectives, as Wilhelmine Schumacher-Köhl, the first chair of the German Catholic Women's Association explained: "Official subsidies to support curative activities that hitherto had been self funded" and the development of mother's cure programmes which matched bodily healing with spiritual enrichment and relaxation". Therefore, "spiritually reliable experienced women with appropriate backgrounds and training, dedicated themselves as mentors and guides for those undergoing recuperative care ...".

Régime change arrived at the start of 1933. Under the Nazis KDFB and "Müttererholung" activities were severely curtailed. Horion vigorously opposed Nazi race policies and several times found herself in conflict with the Gestapo, remaining true to her Christian principles. She was detained for a time in the early 1940s because, it was said, of support she had given to Catholic priests. The authorities forced her to counter-sign the official ban on the KDFB (Catholic women's association) Catholic women's association.

During the early postwar period Emma Horion joined the board of trustees for the "Müttergenesungswerk", a charitable organisation founded in 1950 by Elly Heuss-Knapp (1881-1952), and dedicated to interests and well-being of mothers, "through measures of prevention and rehabilitation". Horion worked for many years as a volunteer for the organisation. In 1954 she was a co-founder of what later became the Catholic "ASG Training Forum" ("Arbeitsgemeinschaft Sozialpädagogik und Gesellschaftsbildung e. V. (ASG). Bildungsforum"), which back then was known, less obscurely, as the "Catholic Working Association for Mother Training" ("Katholische Arbeitsgemeinschaft Mütterbildung"). A particular highpoint came in 1958 with the founding of a Mothers' Recuperation Home at Wipperfürth in the hills to the north of Cologne. The establishment is still known as the Emma Horion House ("Emma-Horion-Haus"). She is also celebrated through the naming of a small street as "Emma-Horion-Weg" in the city's central Old town (Altstadt) quarter.

Emma Horion died in Düsseldorf on 26 May 1982.
