= Allan Montgomery (footballer, born 1920) =

Australian rules footballer

Personal information
- Full name: Allan Alfred Montgomery
- Born: 22 August 1920; Kensington, Victoria
- Died: 2 May 1982 (aged 61); Melbourne, Victoria
- Height: 180 cm (5 ft 11 in)
- Weight: 76 kg (168 lb)

Playing career^{1}
Years	Club	Games (Goals)
1942	North Melbourne	3 (0)
- ^{1} Playing statistics correct to the end of 1942.

Allan Alfred Montgomery (22 August 1920 – 2 May 1982) was an Australian rules footballer who played for the North Melbourne Football Club in the Victorian Football League (VFL).
