= Franciszek Mientki =

Polish priest missionary (1913–1982)

Chaplain Franciszek Mientki
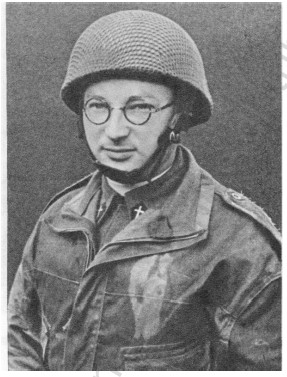
- Father Mientki ca 1943
- Born: 22 October 1913; Bromberg, German Empire
- Died: 20 May 1982 (aged 68); Cielądz, Poland
- Burial place: Cielądz
- Awards
- Religion: Christianism
- Church: Catholic Church
- Congregations served: Congregation of the Holy Spirit

Franciszek Mientki (1913–1982) was a Polish priest, missionary of the Congregation of the Holy Spirit, chaplain of the Polish Armed Forces and lieutenant-colonel in the Polish Army.

== Life ==
Franciszek Mientki was born on 22 October 1913, in Bromberg (Prussian name of Bydgoszcz), then part of the German Empire. The family lived in the suburban commune of Schwedenhöle (today's Szwederowo district), at 83 Taubenstrasse (today's 49 Gołębia Street).

=== Interwar period ===
He graduated from high school in Bydgoszcz with the Missionaries of the Holy Spirit. The Congregation arrived in Poland in 1921, and just opened in 1925 the Holy Spirit Boarding School, operating under the direction of Father Dr. Stanisław Kolipiński. Following the curriculum, Franciszek was sent to Paris for seminary studies in philosophy.

He graduated in 1936, and then studied theology at the University of Fribourg in Switzerland. He took perpetual vows in this city on 10 October 1937, registered as Francois Mientki in the General Bulletins of the Congregation of the Holy Spirit. He was made a deacon on 23 April 1939 and ordained a priest on 23 July 1939.

=== Second World War ===
At the outbreak of World War II, Franciszek was in France where he worked in Polish community centers during the summer break.

On 22 October 1939, Father Mientki was stationed at the Polish military camp located in Camp de Coëtquidan, as part of the Sikorski's Army. Initially, for lack of available chaplaincy positions, he was incorporated as a private in the medical company of the school regiment; afterwards, he was transferred in February 1940 to the Sanitary and Veterinary Training Center in Combourg, Brittany, as a chaplain.

He was then appointed chaplain of the 7th Infantry Regiment (7 Pułk Piechoty (PSZ)) of the 3rd Polish Infantry Division stationed in Guer, Brittany. After the fall of France, Father Mientki and 500 other soldiers headed to the harbour of Saint-Nazaire, from there they sailed for United Kingdom aboard the destroyer HMS Witch, reaching destination on 21 June 1940.

In July 1940, he was nominated chaplain of the 7th Cadre Rifle Battalion of the 3rd Cadre Rifle Brigade, stationed in Moffat, Scotland. The battalion itself was billeted in Newburgh, on the shore of the Firth of Forth. In February 1942, he was transferred from the 1st Officer Training Battalion (I Oficerski Baon Szkolny) to the 1st Reconnaissance Regiment (1 Pułk Rozpoznawczy), keeping his position as a chaplain.

After 1 November 1942, he followed a parachute jumping course; Mientki was the second polish chaplain, after Father Hubert Misiuda, to receive the brigade's parachute badge. In December 1942, he moved as head of the chaplaincy of the 1st Independent Parachute Brigade, then under the command of Stanisław Sosabowski. As such, Franciszek Mientki participated in Operation Market Garden (Battle of Arnhem), from 17 to 26 September 1944, where Father Hubert Misiuda was killed.

After the operations in the Netherlands, he was transferred to the Meuse river area, where, together with his brigade, he took part in organizing the defense of a makeshift airfield.

=== Post war and Polish People's Republic years ===
At the end of the conflict, Father Mientki served in the Allied troops (British occupation zone) in the village of Bersenbrück. He remained there until his demobilization on 15 January 1947.

Once released from military service, Franciszek Mientki returned to Freiburg to complete his studies: he obtained a master's degree in dogmatic theology in March 1948. That same year, he returned to Poland, then under communist rule (PRL). Back to his home country, he became involved in the work of his religious congregation, the Congregation of the Holy Spirit.

On 27 November 1949, he was arrested by officers of the Security Office (Urząd Bezpieczeństwa, UB) and sentenced to 12 years in prison: he stayed in confinement in Rawicz and Wronki jails. Liberated in December 1956, he was rehabilitated and released under an amnesty during the Polish thaw. In the 1960s and the 1970s, Mientki was promoted to the rank of major and lieutenant colonel.

Returning to his congregation, Father Mientki served as superior of the religious house. In addition, he was a lecturer in philosophy and theology, and lecturer in French and English at the higher seminary in Poznań. Eventually, he was appointed novice master of the Congregation of the Holy Spirit in Puszczykowo.

From 16 July 1970 to 1973, he occupied the Provincial superior seat of the Congregation of the Holy Spirit in Poland. After 1974, Father Mientki had been living in Cielądz, near Rawa Mazowiecka. After his death from heart disease, he was buried in the local cemetery.

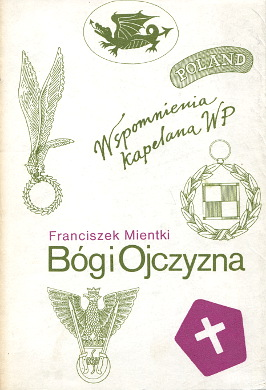
Bóg i Ojczyzna. Wspomnienia kapelana Wojska Polskiego. Franciszek Mientki

== Works ==
- Franciszek Mientki penned his memoirs of the war in a book: Bóg i Ojczyzna. Wspomnienia kapelana Wojska Polskiego (God and Homeland. Memoirs of a Polish Army Chaplain), published in 1985 after his death.

== Awards and commemorations ==
- Recipient of the Cross of Valour.
- Recipient of the parachutist badge (Znak Spadochronowy), a Polish combat badge for soldiers who participated in combat parachute operations.
- Father Mientki is one of the priests mentioned in the Martyrs' Memorial Room, unveiled on 17 June 1999, in the then Higher Seminary of Bydgoszcz (Wyższe Seminarium Duchowne w Bydgoszczy). This place aims to gather evidence of martyrs, priests, and lay people murdered in concentration camps or imprisoned and tortured during Stalinist persecution.
- A commemorative plaque to Mientki is placed on the building of the Pomeranian Military District Museum.
- In 2000, the elementary and middle school in Cielądz (Szkoła Podstawowa w Cielądzu) received as patron's name, Lieutenant Colonel Franciszej Mientki.

== See also ==
- Bydgoszcz
- Polish Army in France (1939–1940)
- Congregation of the Holy Spirit
- Battle of Arnhem

== Bibliography ==
- Stasiak, Władysław Klemens (1991). W locie szumią spadochrony. Wspomnienia żołnierza spod Arnhem [Parachutes swish in flight. Memories of a soldier from Arnhem.] (in Polish). Warszawa: Instytut Wydawniczy „Pax”. ISBN 83-211-1153-X.
- Mientki, Franciszek (1987). Bóg i Ojczyzna. Wspomnienia kapelana Wojska Polskiego [God and Homeland. Memoirs of a Polish Army Chaplain.] (in Polish). Warszawa: Instytut Prasy i Wydawnictw „Novum”.
- Kilian, Mariusz (2016). The story of paratrooper chaplains of the 1st independent parachute brigade. Warsaw: Journal of Science of the gen. Tadeusz Kosciuszko Military Academy of Land Forces. pp. 5–28.
