= Semra Ertan =

Turkish writer in Germany, self-immolated 1982

- Born: 31 May 1956; Mersin, Turkey
- Died: 26 May 1982 (aged 25); Hamburg, West Germany

Semra Ertan (31 May 1956 – 26 May 1982) was a Turkish migrant worker and writer in Germany who, in protest against racism, specifically, the treatment of Turks in Germany, set herself on fire in a Hamburg marketplace.

== Biography ==
Semra Ertan was born on 31 May 1956, in Mersin, Turkey. She was the daughter of Gani Ertan and Vehbiya Ertan, who lived in Kiel and Hamburg as foreign workers. She moved to Germany at the age of 15, with her sisters following a little later. In addition to working as an interpreter, she wrote more than 350 poems and political satires. Devoted to lyricism, one of her most notable poems, "Mein Name ist Ausländer" (My name is foreigner), was published in Turkish school books. She also published books in Germany regarding the "emotional and physical effects that loneliness, deprivation, and alienation have on immigrants".

A few days before her 26th birthday, Ertan called the broadcaster Norddeutscher Rundfunk to announce she would be committing suicide by self-immolation. She explained her motive as a response to growing xenophobia in Germany. The public self-immolation occurred in the early morning hours at the intersection of Simon-von-Utrecht-Strasse and Detlev-Bremer-Straße in Hamburg's St. Pauli quarter. Ertan doused herself with 5 litres (1.1 imp gal; 1.3 US gal) of gasoline that she had purchased at a petrol station that morning and ignited it.

Coincidentally, a police unit was marching past the marketplace at the time and attempted to smother the flames with blankets. However, Ertan died in hospital due to extensive burns.

Ertan's perception of increasing xenophobia was confirmed by statistical data and sociological studies. In November 1978, 39% of Germans demanded that foreigners return to their home countries, while two months before Ertan's death, 68% of West Germans were of this opinion. In addition, violence against foreigners in 1982 was no longer an isolated phenomenon. Furthermore, foreigners were increasingly excluded from social life in the country, and contact with them by the Germans was avoided to the extent possible. With unemployment and housing shortages in Germany, migrant workers were increasingly seen by Germans as competitors to the workplace and living space.

== Legacy ==
German novelist Sten Nadolny credited the genesis of his 1990 novel Selim oder Die Gabe der Rede (Selim or the Gift of Speech) to Ertan's suicide. The novel's protagonist, Ayse, is a fictionalized version of Ertan. German investigative journalist Günter Wallraff dedicated his 1985 book Ganz unten (The Lowest of the Low), which examined his experience posing as a Turkish guest worker in Germany, inter alia, to Semra Ertan. Semra Ertan, a 2013 documentary produced by Cana Bilir-Meier, screened at the International Short Film Festival Oberhausen and received the Innovative Film Award at the YOUKI International Youth Media Festival Austria.

== Bibliography ==
- Berman, Nina (2011). German Literature on the Middle East: Discourses and Practices, 1000–1989. University of Michigan Press. ISBN 978-0-472-11751-2.
- Cheesman, Tom (2007). Novels of Turkish German Settlement: Cosmopolite Fictions. Camden House. ISBN 978-1-57113-374-8.
- Gramling, David; Kaes, Anton (2007). Germany in Transit: Nation and Migration, 1955–2005. University of California Press. ISBN 978-0-520-24894-6.
- University of Oklahoma Press (1995). World Literature Today. University of Oklahoma Press.
