= Edward Tolhurst =

Australian cricketer

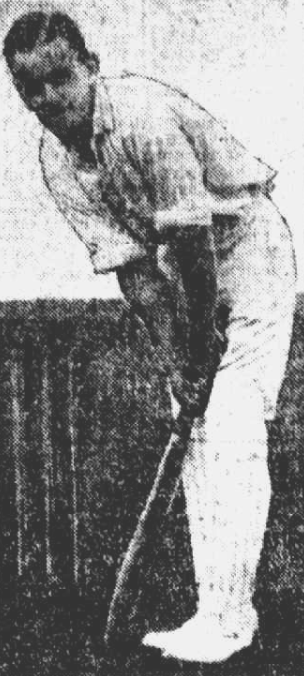

Personal information
- Born: 29 October 1895; Melbourne, Australia
- Died: 24 May 1982 (aged 86); Melbourne, Australia

Domestic team information
- Years: Team
- 1922-1931: Victoria
- Source: Cricinfo, 20 November 2015

Edward Tolhurst (29 October 1895 – 24 May 1982) was an Australian cricketer. He played eight first-class cricket matches for Victoria between 1922 and 1931.

== See also ==
- List of Victoria first-class cricketers
