= Hubert Thorn =

English cricketer

Personal information
- Full name: Hubert Wethered Thorn
- Born: 21 April 1909; Tiptree, Essex, England
- Died: 20 May 1982 (aged 73); Colchester, Essex, England
- Role: Bowler

Domestic team information
- Years: Team
- 1928: Essex

Career statistics
Competition	FC
Matches	1
Runs scored	12
Batting average
100s/50s
Top score
Balls bowled
Wickets	1
Bowling average
5 wickets in innings
10 wickets in match
Best bowling
Catches/stumpings
- Source: Cricinfo, 21 July 2013

Hubert Thorn (21 April 1909 – 20 May 1982) was an English cricketer. He played one match for Essex in 1928.
