= Sally Lippman =

American lawyer and club dancer (1900–1982)

- Born: October 19, 1900; Manhattan, New York City, New York, U.S.
- Died: May 26, 1982 (aged 81); Manhattan, New York City, New York, U.S.
- Other names: Disco Sally
- Occupation: Lawyer
- Known for: Studio 54 dancer

Sally Lippman (October 19, 1900 – May 26, 1982), also known as Disco Sally, was an American lawyer best known for being a regular dancer at the Studio 54 and Xenon discotheques.

Lippman was an attorney, although she stated that she had stopped practicing law formally by the late 1930s. Her first marriage was to a fellow attorney who worked for the Federation for Jewish Philanthropies and in public relations. According to Lippman, while she and her first husband who died in 1975 shared a mutual appreciation for "good music", he did not enjoy dancing.

Lippman's first visit to Studio 54 occurred in September 1977 at the invitation of a 25-year-old gay male friend. Although she initially declined, she eventually agreed to attend, bringing cotton to stuff her ears against the club's high volume levels. At the time, the venue had a notoriously restrictive and exclusive admissions policy, with doormen frequently rejecting hundreds of hopeful patrons to curate a specific aesthetic and social atmosphere, often leaving large crowds on the sidewalk for hours without ever being granted entry.

Upon their arrival, Lippman and her friend were initially denied admission and waited outside for over three hours. They were ultimately granted entry only after Lippman complimented a staff member who was assisting with Sylvester Stallone's departure from the club. During this visit, club co-owner Steve Rubell granted her permanent "no cover" status, allowing her and her friends to attend anytime they like and bypass the door charge. After this first visit, she established herself as a regular at the venue.

Lippman married her second husband, John Touzos, in 1980. Two years later, on May 26, 1982, she died at age 81 at Mount Sinai Hospital after having been hospitalized due to complications from a recent surgery.
