= Edwin N. Clark =

United States Army general

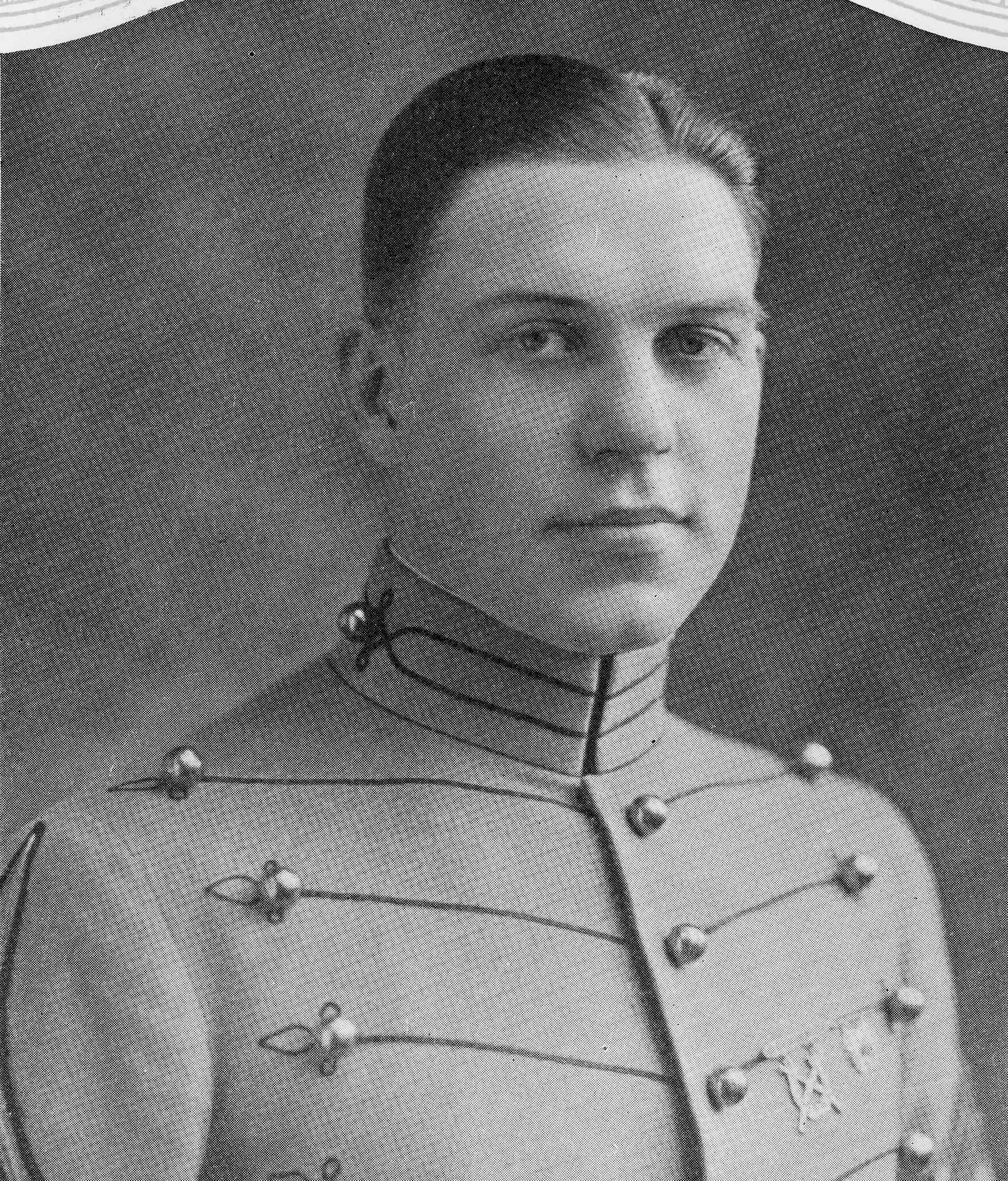
- At West Point in 1922
- Born: 1902; Parkersburg, Iowa
- Died: May 1, 1982 (aged 80); Fairfield, Connecticut
- Military career
- Allegiance: United States of America
- Branch: United States Army Reserve
- Rank: Brigadier General
- Conflicts: World War II
- Other work: Attorney

Edwin Norman Clark was an American attorney and army officer who served in logistics and supply roles during WWII. A 1922 graduate of West Point, he resigned his commission the same year, earned a law degree from Harvard. He worked in private practice before joining the army. He assisted General, and later President, Eisenhower in various capacities.

== Early life ==
Edwin Norman Clark (1902–1982) was born in Parkersburg, Iowa, in 1902. He graduated from the United States Military Academy at West Point in June 1922 but resigned his commission in September of the same year. He immediately entered Harvard Law School and upon graduation practiced law in New York.

== World War II ==
During the period 1940 to 1945, Clark served two tours of active duty in the Army with preceding and intervening private consulting work related to military supply and logistics. Clark was involved in supply and ordnance matters during the North African campaign and served as Dwight D. Eisenhower's Deputy G-4 (assistant chief of staff for logistics) at SHAEF (Supreme Headquarters Allied Expeditionary Force).

== Post-war ==
After the war, Clark returned to private consulting work but continued to serve Eisenhower. In the late 1940s, in conjunction with a small group of liberal Republicans, including Russell Davenport and Senator James Duff, Clark worked for Eisenhower's presidential candidacy. As part of this planning group, Clark shuttled back and forth between the U.S. and Europe to ensure the secrecy of discussions with Eisenhower. The material documents Eisenhower's early interest in the presidency and a 1951 meeting between Taft and Eisenhower. Documentation includes correspondence and Clark's memoir.

In 1949, Clark undertook a second project for Eisenhower when asked to consider a means of assisting the financially distressed American Military Institute. Discussions resulted in a plan to reorganize the Institute under the auspices of Columbia University and broaden its scope to include the study of war and peace. Eventually Columbia established a separate Institute of War and Peace Studies, leaving the American Military Institute to secure other funding arrangements. There is extensive documentation of Clark's efforts to establish the Institute of War and Peace Studies. He remained in contact with the Institute until the mid-1950s.

In 1951, Clark became involved in a third Eisenhower project, Jo Davidson's bust of Eisenhower. Through Clark's efforts, a bust was placed at the U.S. Military Academy in 1953. A year later a second bust was placed at the Royal Military College at Sandhurst. Then in 1980, Clark became involved in a controversy over the illegal reproduction of the bust.

Last, Clark served Eisenhower in the latter stages of the 1952 campaign by submitting a memorandum on U.S. Pacific policy, which he later elaborated to include mutual security matters. The documentation consists of the memorandum and a small quantity of related material.

In 1949, Clark became involved in the Institute for Creative Research, a public policy group organized by Russell Davenport. In 1953, Clark's consulting firm undertook an economic survey of the Dominican Republic. This study was completed in 1954 and submitted to Eisenhower in February 1955. Last, in 1958 Clark joined a group of businessmen and scientists promoting the establishment of the International Institute for Scientific Research and the European Research Institute. This led to a memorandum, "Plan for Scientific Cooperation in the Free World", which Clark sent to Eisenhower in April 1959. Eisenhower's science adviser, however, reviewed the proposal unfavorably.

== Later life ==
During the 1960s, Clark developed serious medical problems that necessitated giving up his consulting work and in part explains the dearth of documentation from this decade. In the early 1970s, after regaining his health, Clark embarked upon a project to bring together documentation of the various important events of his career. He referred to the project as his curriculum vitae. The main facet of the project was the writing of his memoirs, but in preparing for the task he submerged himself in histories of the period, collected and organized primary documentation, and contacted people he had worked with in the course of his career. Some of the contacts led to meetings between Clark and his former associates for the purpose of compiling commentaries on their shared experiences.

He died in Fairfield, Connecticut on May 1, 1982.
