= Abel Guidet =

French politician (1890–1944)

- Born: 6 November 1890; Bapaume, Pas-de-Calais, France
- Died: 27 November 1944 (aged 54); Gross Rosen, Germany
- Occupation: Politician

Abel Guidet (French pronunciation: [abɛl ɡidɛ]; 6 November 1890 – 27 November 1944) was a French politician. A decorated veteran of World War I, he served as a member of the Chamber of Deputies from 1936 to 1942, representing Pas-de-Calais. On 10 July 1940, he voted in favour of granting the cabinet presided by Marchal Philippe Pétain authority to draw up a new constitution, thereby effectively ending the French Third Republic and establishing Vichy France. However, later he joined the French Resistance. He was arrested by the Nazis during World War II, and he died in the Gross-Rosen concentration camp.

== Early life ==
Abel Guidet was born on 6 November 1980 in Bapaume, Pas-de-Calais, France. He served in the French Army during World War II. He was awarded the Croix de Guerre, the Médaille militaire, Military Medal and the knighthood of the Legion of Honour for his service.

== Career ==
Guidet became the mayor of his hometown of Bapaume in 1929. He served as a member of the Chamber of Deputies from 1936 to 1942, representing Pas-de-Calais.

== Arrest, death and legacy ==
Guidet was arrested by the Nazis on 27 November 1943, and he died in the Gross-Rosen concentration camp. He is the namesake of the square Abel-Guidet in Bapaume. On 27 November 2014, the city of Bapaume organized a commemorative event in his honour.
