= Emili Salut Payà =

Emili Salut i Payà
- Born: 13 November 1918; Barcelona, Spain
- Died: 16 May 1982 (aged 63) Barcelona, Spain
- Occupations: Trumpeter and composer

Emili Salut i Payà (November 13, 1918 - May 16, 1982) was a Catalan trumpeter and composer.

== Biography ==
Emili Salut i Payà was born in Barcelona.

Emili Salut attended the Municipal School of Barcelona, where he studied violin with the teachers Sainz de la Maza and Costa and piano with Joseph Climent. But his passion was composition. Later, he took a great interest in the trumpet, so he started lessons with Lluís Rovira and became part of ensembles in the Avenue of Parallel until 1936, when the Spanish Civil War broke out.

In 1939, he went to the USSR, where he studied to become a pilot. Between 1940 and 1941, he was a musician of the Mijail Lipski Orchestra in Moscow. In 1941, when German troops entered Russian territories, he was locked up for eight years in prisons and concentration camps. When he was released in 1948, he continued with his music studies.

He married his first wife, Isida Filippova. They had two daughters, Francesca and Violeta.

In 1957 he was able to return to Spain and live in Madrid and Barcelona. He worked at the Radio Nacional de España and then as a teacher at the Assimil Academy.

== Compositions ==
=== Chamber music ===
- Collection of six Cànons a 4 and 2 voices, Op. 8 (1953 - 1976), for strings
- Guerras civiles de Granada, Op. 13 (1957), for violin and piano
- Solo de concierto, for voice, violin and piano

=== Voice and piano ===
- Agraint un clavell (1982)
- Invierno (1946), written in the concentration camp
- Recuerdos, memories from the concentration camp

=== Piano ===
- Canone, Op. 53 (1980)
- Elegie, Op. 36 (1940)
- Estudi núm. 1: Satànic (1953)
- Preludio, Op. 53 (1976)
- Recoup, Op. 35 (1970)
- Romanza (1947)
- Sonata núm. 1 (1947)
- 12 Valsos per a piano, Op. 15 (1945 - 1971)

=== Organ ===
- Fugueta, d'introducció i comiat per a una cerimònia nupcial, Op. 25

=== Choir ===
- Canción Yalta, Op. 9, Russian text
- El cargol, Op. 1 (1978)

=== Cobla ===
- Els brivalls del barri, Op. 3 (1965), sardana for choir and cobla (the traditional music ensemble of Catalonia)
- El cargol, Op. 3 (1979), for choir and cobla
- En Pere Gallarí, Op. 3 (1976), for choir and cobla
- Un pont de cobre l'altre, Op. 3 (1963), for choir and cobla
- Remei, Op. 3 (1962), for choir and cobla
- La vall, Op. 3 (1965), for choir and cobla

=== Orchestra ===
- Introducció i comiat per a una cerimònia nupcial, Op. 25 (1963)
- Kalinka, Op. 48
- Retaule nadalench, Op. 39 (1962)
- Romanza, Op. 49 (1962)
- Rondó per al tema de Krasnii sarafan, Op. 47
- Santa Eulària, esbós poemàtich (1976)
- Suite amussette, Op. 35
- Suite Tártara núm. 3 (1953)
- Tonadilla y Copla, Op. 42 (1969), dedicated to Russian people. The location of this work is unknown

=== Band ===
- Retaule nadalench, Op. 39 (1962)

=== Ballet ===
- El Circo, suite for symphony orchestra
- Suite lirique, Op. 11
- Werther, Op. 16 (1950 - 1978)

=== Arrangements ===
- Jota aragonesa, of Glimka, instrumentated for band (1962)
- Ave Maria, of Franz Schubert, instrumentated for soloist, choir and orchestra

=== Jazz ===
- Abschor lied
- Aufwiedersehen
- Foxbrush, foxtrot (1947)
- Stormbound
- Foxtrot
- Glaspliter, intermezzo
- Ich will das immer Frühling sein soll
- A little house on Michigan Sea
- Mutter liebe
- Sombrero cordobés (1947)

==== Jazz arrangements ====
- Love is a many-splendored thing, of Sammy Fain, arranged for trumpet
- La sombra de tu sonrisa, of J. Mandel i P. Webster, arranged for trumpet
- Blue Skies, arranged for piano
