= Ernie Watson (footballer, born 1896) =

Australian rules footballer

Personal information
- Full name: Ernest James Watson
- Born: 3 December 1896; Clunes, Victoria
- Died: 2 May 1976 (aged 79); Heidelberg, Victoria
- Height: 183 cm (6 ft 0 in)
- Weight: 87 kg (192 lb)

Playing career^{1}
Years	Club	Games (Goals)
1923	Fitzroy	1 (0)
- ^{1} Playing statistics correct to the end of 1923.

Ernie Watson (3 December 1896 – 2 May 1976) was an Australian rules footballer who played with Fitzroy in the Victorian Football League (VFL).
