= Husein Đozo =

Bosnian Islamic theologian, activist and SS officer (1912-1982)

- Born: 3 July 1912; Bare, Goražde, Bosnia and Herzegovina, Austria-Hungary
- Died: 30 May 1982 (aged 69); Sarajevo, SR Bosnia and Herzegovina, SFR Yugoslavia
- Education: Al-Azhar University
- Occupations: Theologian, activist

Husein Đozo (3 July 1912 – 30 May 1982) was a Bosnian Islamic theologian and activist, Sturmbannführer of the SS and president of the Association of Ulema in the Socialist Federal Republic of Yugoslavia.

== Biography ==
From 1923, Đozo attended the Madrasa of Mehmed Pasha Kukavica in Foča, and then from 1925 the Merhemić Madrasa in Sarajevo. At this time, he also studied at the Atmejdan Madrasa in Sarajevo. In 1928, he enrolled in the prestigious Sharia Judicial School in Sarajevo, graduating in 1933. In 1934 he moved to Egypt to study in Cairo, at Al-Azhar University, where he graduated from the Sharia Law School in 1939.

During World War II, when Bosnia was annexed to the fascist Independent State of Croatia, as a member of the board of the El-Hidaje association, Đozo signed a well-known resolution condemning the Ustasha policy. In 1943, he joined the ranks of the 13th Handžar Division organized by the Waffen-SS and served as imam of the 28th regiment, and occasionally as divisional imam. Đozo openly wrote a letter to Himmler stating the readiness of many soldiers to lay down their lives for Adolf Hitler: "I consider it my duty to express my gratitude to the Reichführer on behalf of divisional imams and hundreds and thousands of poor people in Bosnia." After the war, Đozo was sentenced to five years in prison and loss of civil rights for participating in the division.

In the period of 1950 until 1960, Đozo worked first in the Leather Products Factory, and then in the City Roads Administration, and then as a senior bookkeeper in the "Metal" company in Sarajevo. In 1960, he began working in the Supreme Islamic Eldership, where he remained until his death in 1982. During the 1960s and early 1970s, Đozo also worked part-time as a professor at Gazi Husrev-beg Madrasa where he taught akhlaq, aqidah, fiqh, hadith and tafsir. In 1964, Đozo was elected president of the Ilmija (Ulema) Association in the Socialist Republic of Bosnia and Herzegovina. In 1970, he started the newspaper Preporod, of which he was the editor-in-chief until 1972 and again from 1976 to 1979. With the opening of the Islamic Theological Faculty in 1977, Đozo became a full professor of Quranic interpretation.

Đozo also worked on many other projects, such as the tafsir of the Qur'an and the like, but the column "Questions and Answers" in the then "Glasnik", known as "Đozo's fatwas" (Đozine fetve), which he started, was especially important for ordinary Muslims with whom through these fatwas prof. Đozo communicated directly, writing about things such as women's rights, interest, Muslim clothing, innovations, sects in Islam, etc. A German cultural club named after Đozo sparked public outrage, since he was affiliated with the Waffen-SS.

== Death ==
Đozo died on 30 May 1982, in Sarajevo, at the age of 69. On 6 October 1990, the Supreme Assembly of the Islamic Community of Bosnia and Herzegovina passed a decision on his complete rehabilitation, and the Faculty of Islamic Sciences dedicated the first Proceedings to him on the occasion of his death. His grave is located within the "Bare" cemetery in Sarajevo.

== Legacy ==
A street in Sarajevo is named after Đozo. In 1995–1996, a primary school in Goražde was named after him; it had previously been named after the inventor Nikola Tesla. The decision to rename the school remains controversial among locals, and has been criticized by the local branch of the Association of Anti-fascists and Veterans of the National Liberation War (Serbo-Croatian: Savez antifašista i boraca Narodnooslobodilačkog rata; SABNOR). In response, Damir Žuga, a representative of the local school district, told a Radio Free Europe/Radio Liberty reporter in 2016 that the decision to rename the school was not contentious.
