= Ronnie Elliott (artist) =

American artist

Ronnie Elliot
- Born: Ronnie Greenspan; December 16, 1910; New York City
- Died: 22 May 1982 (aged 71); Paris, France
- Known for: sculpture, collage, lithography, etching

Ronnie Rose Elliott (née Greenspan; 16 December 1910 – 22 May 1982) was an American sculptor and collagist, who worked also as a printmaker, using the techniques of lithography and etching.

== Biography ==
She was born in New York City, to Sol and Sara Greenspan, and she worked first as a sculptor. With a scholarship at the Art Students League of New York she studied painting, but only for a few months. She travelled in Europe, lived at Honolulu enrolled in the Academy of Fine Arts. She married John Elliott, from Britain, in 1936, but the marriage lasted only a year. She kept the last name having already started using it professionally.

Elliot's first solo exhibit, held in 1937, was at the Delphic Gallery in New York. Elliott was friends with Dorothea Tanning, who in 1942 introduced her to her second husband, John Knapp, a writer at the Wall Street Journal who worked with Tanning's husband. Throughout the 1940s the Marquie Gallery hosted solo exhibits of Elliott's work. The Museum of Modern Art's 1948 exhibit "Collage," included 30 artists, Elliott being the only woman included. Elliott also exhibited at the Salon des Réalités Nouvelles several times around 1950. Returning to New York, she exhibited at the Rose Fried Gallery.

Elliot's work is held by the Metropolitan Museum of Art, the Whitney Museum of American Art, American University Museum, The Hyde Collection, and the Museum of Modern Art.
