= Nirmal Kumar Dutta =

Indian pharmacologist

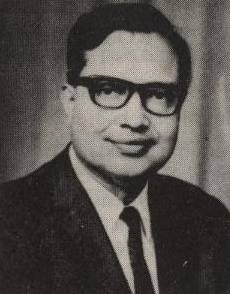
- Dr. Nirmal Kumar Dutta
- Born: 1 December 1913; West Bengal, India
- Died: 2 May 1982 (aged 68)
- Education: University of Calcutta; Oxford University
- Known for: Pharmacological studies on cholera
- Awards: 1955 ICMR Basantidevi Amirchand Award; 1965 Watumull Foundation Award; 1965 Shanti Swarup Bhatnagar Prize; 1981 INSA Shree Dhanwantar Prize
- Scientific career
- Fields: Pharmacology
- Workplaces: Haffkine Institute; Indian Council of Medical Research

Nirmal Kumar Dutta (1913–1982) was an Indian pharmacologist, medical academic and the director of Haffkine Institute, Mumbai. He was known for his contributions to the studies on cholera and was an elected fellow of the National Academy of Medical Sciences, National Academy of Sciences, India and the Indian National Science Academy. The Council of Scientific and Industrial Research, the apex agency of the Government of India for scientific research, awarded him the Shanti Swarup Bhatnagar Prize for Science and Technology, one of the highest Indian science awards for his contributions to Medical Sciences in 1965. (Note: Long link - please select award year to see details)

== Biography ==
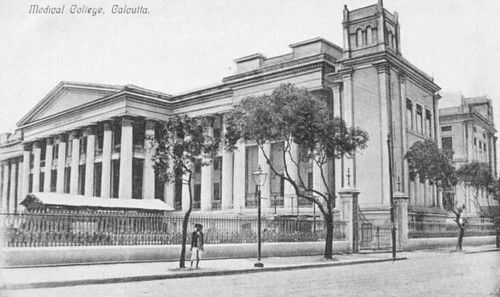
Calcutta Medical College in 1910

N. K. Dutta, born on 1 December 1913 in the Indian state of West Bengal, did his graduate studies in medicine at Calcutta Medical College of the University of Calcutta and after earning an MBBS, moved to Oxford University for his higher studies from where he secured a DPhil in 1949. Subsequently, he had a second stint at Oxford when he received the degree of DSc from the institution in 1964. A major part of his career was at Haffkine Institute, one of the oldest medical research institutes in India where he served as its director. He also served as the deputy director general of the Indian Council of Medical Research.

Dutta did extensive researches on cholera and pioneered the use of infant rabbits for developing a laboratory model for the studies which is reported to have promoted cholera studies in countries where the disease was not prevalent. In 1959, he identified the toxin generated by Vibrio cholerae which causes diarrhoea during animal testing and he used the classical biotype, Inaba serotype, V. cholerae strain 569B for the first time, which is being followed today. He also developed a methodology for the evaluation of vaccines and antiserum and was known to have proposed therapeutic protocols for treating cholera. He documented his researches by way of several medical papers published in peer-reviewed journals (Note: Please see Selected bibliography section) and his work has been cited by a number of authors and researchers.

Dutta was associated with the World Health Organization, serving as a member of their Experts' Panel in Bacterial Diseases and Cholera. He was a member of the Indian Pharmacopoeia Commission and the Drugs Technical Advisory Board of the Government of India and sat in the Expert Scientific Committee of Indian Council of Medical Research. He was also a member of the editorial boards of Archives internationales de Pharmacodynamie et de Thérapie and the Indian Journal of Pharmacology and served as the president of the Maharashtra chapter of the Indian Pharmaceutical Association. He died on 2 May 1982, at the age of 68.

== Awards and honors ==
Dutta received the Basantidevi Amirchand Award of the Indian Council of Medical Research in 1955 and the Watumull Foundation Award in Medicine in 1965; the same year as the Council of Scientific and Industrial Research awarded him Shanti Swarup Bhatnagar Prize, one of the highest Indian science awards. In between, the Indian National Science Academy elected him as a fellow in 1963; INSA would honor him again with the Shree Dhanwantari Prize in 1981. He was also a fellow of the National Academy of Sciences, India and the National Academy of Medical Sciences.

== Selected bibliography ==
- Dutta N. K., Habbu M. K. (1955). "Experimental cholera in infant rabbits: a method for chemotherapeutic investigation". Br J Pharmacol Chemother. 10 (2): 153–9. doi:10.1111/j.1476-5381.1955.tb00074.x. PMC 1509487. PMID 14389652.
- Dutta N. K., Panse N. V., Kulkarni D. R. (1959). "Role of cholera a toxin in experimental cholera". J. Bacteriol. 78 (4): 594–5. doi:10.1128/JB.78.4.594-595.1959. PMC 290591. PMID 13818912.
- Dutta N. K., Panse N. V. (1963). "An experimental study on the usefulness of bacteriophage in the prophylaxis and treatment of cholera". Bull World Health Organ. 28 (3): 357–60. PMC 2554721. PMID 20604146.
- Dutta N. K., Panse N. V., Jhala H. I. (1963). "Choleragenic Property of Certain Strains of El Tor, Non-agglutinable, and Water Vibrios Confirmed Experimentally". Br Med J. 1 (5339): 1200–3. doi:10.1136/bmj.1.5339.1200. PMC 2123573. PMID 20789782.
- Williams E. M., Dohadwalla A. N., Dutta N. K. (1969). "Diarrhea and accumulation of intestinal fluid in infant rabbits infected with Vibrio cholerae in an isolated jejunal segment". J Infect Dis. 120 (6): 645–51. doi:10.1093/infdis/120.6.645. PMID 5374968.

== See also ==
- Robert Koch
- Timeline of cholera
