= Everett McGowan =

American ice hockey player

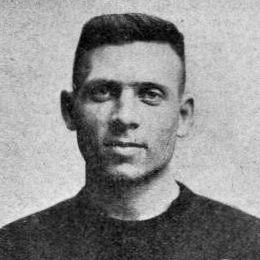
- McGowan in 1920.
- Born: March 20, 1900 Crookston, Minnesota, U.S.
- Died: May 1, 1982 (aged 82) Kiamesha Lake, New York, U.S.
- Height: 5 ft 7 in (170 cm)
- Weight: 170 lb (77 kg; 12 st 2 lb)
- Position: Right wing
- Played for: Vancouver Maroons
- Playing career: 1918–1929

Edward Everett McGowan (March 20, 1900 – May 1, 1982) was an American professional ice hockey player. He played with the Vancouver Maroons of the Western Canada Hockey League. He also played with the Winnipeg Maroons of the American Hockey Association, Edmonton Eskimos of the PrHL, and the Springfield Indians of the CAHL.

Prior to his career in professional ice hockey McGowan won the 1920 international outdoor ice skating championship in Lake Placid, New York.

After retirement, McGowan and his wife operated the indoor skating rink at the Raleigh Hotel in South Fallsburg, New York. McGowan occasionally made appearances at annual NHL old timers hockey games in Canada, where he remained well known in hockey circles.

He lettered in baseball and football while he was a student at the St. Thomas Military Academy, in Minnesota, and was chosen as football halfback for the 1920 Minnesota All State Eleven. His plans were to continue his football career with his best friend at Notre Dame under Knute Rockne until approached by a sports promoter who had seen him on ice breaking speed skating records. That same year he won the national and international speed skating in 1920 as an amateur. He broke all existing world speed skating records. He had astonished the skating world by scoring the triple triumph and was the first skater to win the three national and international speed titles in a single year: National Amateur Outdoor at Saranac Lake; the International Amateur Outdoor at Lake Placid; and the International Amateur Indoor at St. Paul. He took the offer from the promoter and became a professional speed skater and was considered the king of professional skaters for the next seven years.

He often played shortstop and left field in professional baseball teams in the Dakota League and in later in Iowa. He also was a welterweight boxer in 1921 under Paddy Mullin with Harry Willis, Mike O'Dowd.

He played Hockey in 1924-1930 for the Vancouver Maroons, Winnipeg Maroons, Edmonton Eskimos and Springfield Indians.

He also performed professionally on both roller skates and with his wife Ruth Mack in ice skating shows. In 1936 he took part in the first touring ice show, the Ice Follies. This show was created by Oscar Johnson and the Shipstad brothers, Eddie and Roy. They traveled to New York's Madison Square Garden. It was after their tour that skating shows became popular. He and Ruth toured for many years together including helping found the Ice Capades.

In 1962 he was elected to the National Speed Skater Museum Hall of Fame.

In 1972 he was inducted into the ISI Ice Skating Hall of Fame.
