= Czesław Zbierański =

Polish engineer, pioneer of Polish aviation, major of Polish Army

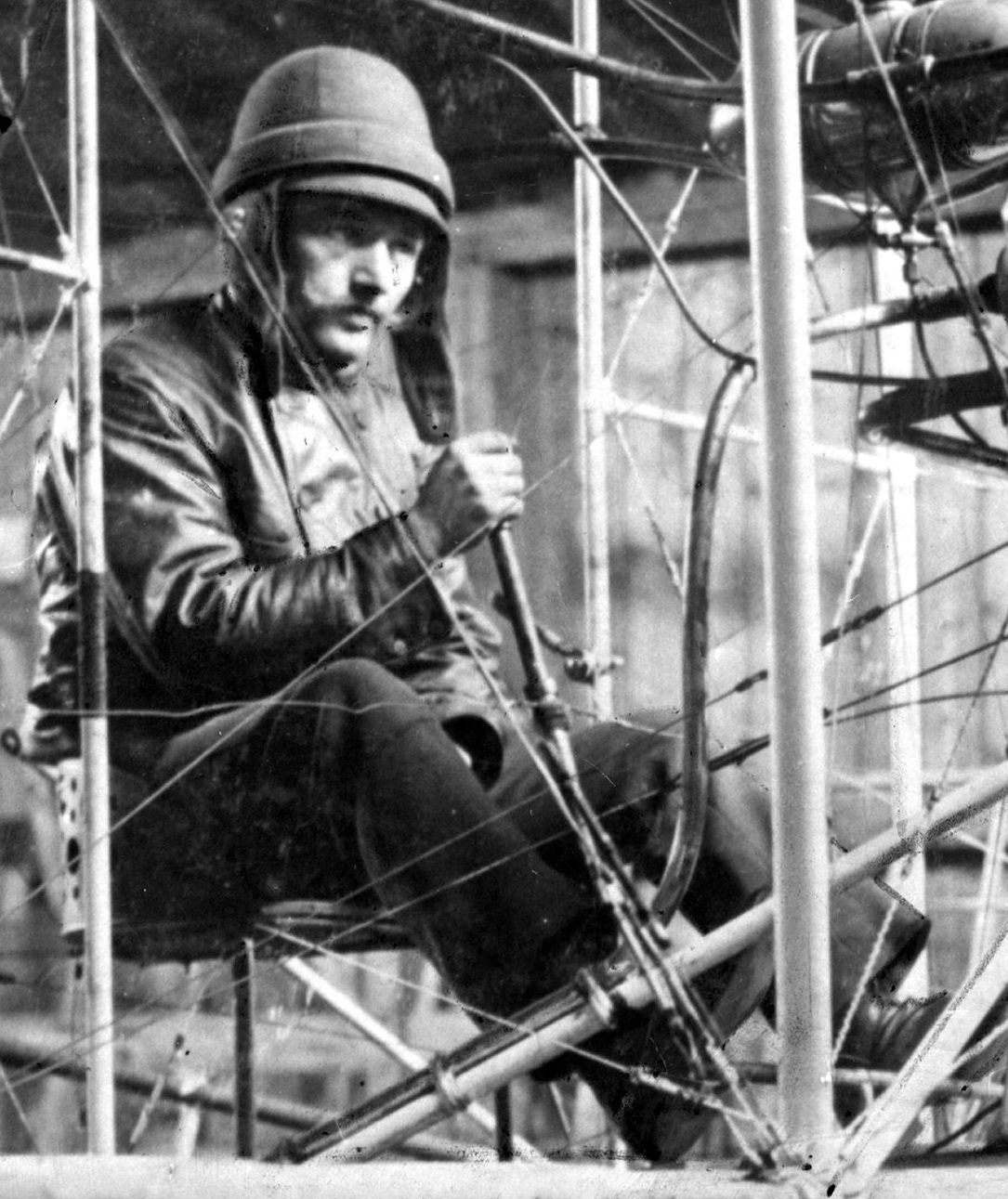
- Born: December 6, 1885
- Died: May 31, 1982 (aged 96); New York City
- Occupation: Engineer

Czesław Michał Zbierański (1885–1982) was a Polish engineer, pioneer of Polish aviation, major of Polish Army. In 1910–1911, with Stanisław Cywiński, he constructed an aircraft with two pairs of wings, the first Polish aircraft constructed partially with metal. In the 1920s, Zbierański was producing cars, motorcycles and rail draisines. He was also a Polonia activist, and founder of an English language book collection of the Aviation Institute in Warsaw (1962). He was awarded the 5th Class Virtuti Militari.

== Biography ==
Zbierański was born on 6 December 1885 in Warsaw.

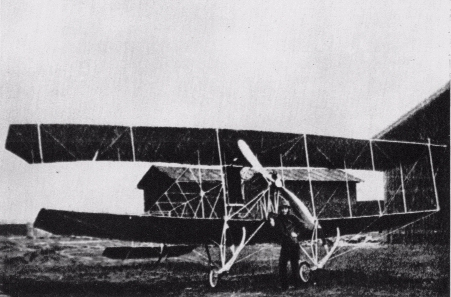
Zbierański i Cywiński

He developed aviation interests after graduating at Lviv Polytechnic. He co-founded Aviators Circles (Polish: Koło Awiatów) in which, with Stanisław Cywiński (who joined to the circles later), he planned, designed and constructed an aircraft, Zbierański i Cywiński. The first attempt to fly, in May 1911, failed. The reason for failure was that a part of the aircraft skin burned. On September 25, 1911 in Warsaw, Michał Scipio del Campio successfully flew the aircraft for a distance of about 15–20 kilometers in 15 minutes.

During World War I, Zbierański was in Polish Legions. During World War II, he worked on the construction of anti-aircraft warfare, and as a technical supervisor in production of Avro Anson V at the Federal Aircraft Company. Before the end of World War II he moved to U.S., dying in New York City on 31 May 1982.

== See also ==
- List of aviation pioneers
