= Ernie Watson (footballer, born 1908) =

Australian rules footballer

Personal information
- Full name: Ernie Watson
- Born: 7 September 1908
- Died: 5 May 1982 (aged 73)
- Original team: Macedon

Playing career^{1}
Years	Club	Games (Goals)
1929–1930	Essendon	23 (0)
- ^{1} Playing statistics correct to the end of 1930.

Ernie Watson (7 September 1908 – 5 May 1982) was an Australian rules footballer who played with Essendon in the Victorian Football League (VFL).
