= Hubert Lindop =

English cricketer

Personal information
- Full name: Hubert Harry Lindop
- Born: 21 August 1907; Walsall, Staffordshire, England
- Died: 30 May 1982 (aged 74); Stafford, Staffordshire, England
- Batting: Unknown

Domestic team information
- Years: Team
- 1936: Marylebone Cricket Club
- 1933–1934: Staffordshire

Career statistics
Competition	First-class
Matches	1
Runs scored	25
Batting average	25.00
100s/50s	–/–
Top score	19*
Balls bowled	–
Wickets	–
Bowling average	–
5 wickets in innings	–
10 wickets in match	–
Best bowling	–
Catches/stumpings	–/–
- Source: Cricinfo, 30 November 2011

Hubert Harry Lindop (21 August 1907 – 30 May 1982) was an English cricketer. Lindop's batting style is unknown. He was born at Walsall, Staffordshire.

Lindop made his debut for Staffordshire in the 1933 Minor Counties Championship against Denbighshire. He made a further appearance for the county the following season against the Yorkshire Second XI. He later made a single first-class appearance for the Marylebone Cricket Club against Ireland at Observatory Lane, Dublin in 1936. In the Marylebone Cricket Club's first-innings he opened the batting, scoring 6 runs before being dismissed by James Graham, while in their second-innings he moved down the batting order to number nine, scoring 19 not out. Ireland won the match by 285 runs.

He died at Stafford, Staffordshire on 30 May 1982.
