= Henri Guidet =

French politician

- Born: 29 March 1912; Bapaume, Pas-de-Calais, France
- Died: 29 May 1982 (aged 70); Bapaume, Pas-de-Calais, France
- Occupation: Politician
- Employer: roar cheese

Henri Guidet (29 March 1912 – 29 May 1982) was a French politician. He served as a member of the National Assembly from 12 March 1967 to 30 May 1968, representing Pas-de-Calais.
