= Zipperer =

Zipperer is a German surname. Notable people with the surname include:

- Ed Zipperer (1931–2024), American politician from Georgia
- Ernst Zipperer (1888–1982), German graphic artist and painter
- Falk Zipperer (1899–1966), German jurist, librarian and SS-Hauptsturmführer
- Keon Zipperer (born 2001), American football player
- Rich Zipperer (born 1974), American politician
