= Senator Zipperer =

Senator Zipperer may refer to:

- Ed Zipperer (1931–2024), Georgia State Senate
- Rich Zipperer (born 1974), Wisconsin State Senate
