= Falk Zipperer =

German jurist and librarian

Falk-Wolfgang Zipperer (24 December 1899, in Darmstadt – 1966 in Bonn) was a German jurist and librarian. Zipperer was one of Heinrich Himmler's closest friends.

== Life ==
Falk Zipperer attended Wilhelmsgymnasium in Munich. In April 1917, Zipperer left grammar school and began officer training. After his participation in the First World War, reaching the rank of lieutenant, Zipperer began studying jurisprudence at the Ludwig-Maximilians-Universität München (LMU), under, among others, Konrad Beyerle. In 1921, he became active in the Corps Vandalia Graz. He finished his studies in 1928.

In 1933, he was appointed to the Persönlicher Stab Reichsführer-SS. In 1935, he became a member of the Nazi Party. He was assigned as a student to Karl August Eckhardt by his old friend Heinrich Himmler. With a dissertation on the Haberfeldtreiben with Eugen Wohlhaupter, he received his doctorate of law in 1937 at the University of Kiel. In the same year, he was Eckhardt's assistant and chief collaborator in the reorganization of the Deutschrechtlichen Instituts des Reichsführers-SS (German Legal Institute of the Reichsführer-SS) at the University of Bonn. Habilitated in 1941, he was appointed the following year to the faculty.

After the death of legal historian Karl-Hans Maria Ganahl in 1942, Zipperer was appointed as a professor for German legal history at the University of Innsbruck on Himmler's request in June 1944, although the faculty preferred Otto Stolz. But Zipperer, who was serving as a Waffen-SS-Hauptsturmführer at the front, did not fulfill his professorship.

At the end of the war, Zipperer was a prisoner of war. As a "Reichsdeutscher", he was discharged from the Austrian university service. He then worked in the higher service of the Federal Library (Reichstag library) for scientific cataloging.

== Relationship with Himmler ==
Zipperer and Heinrich Himmler were best friends as children in Munich, and they remained very close throughout their lives. Coincidentally, both of their families moved to Landshut during their childhoods. When Zipperer returned home from service in the First World War, the two were again classmates, and they spent a great deal of time writing poems, an interest that bound them together. Himmler once remarked that Zipperer was "a really nice, good friend and a great man of genius". When Zipperer married in 1937, Himmler gave a lunch party. In 1938, Himmler accepted Zipperer into the SS. On the occasion of Himmler's 40th birthday in 1940, Zipperer published an essay in a Festschrift. When Himmler was preparing for Christmas in 1944, he put down Zipperer's wife, Liselotte, for a gift.

== Publications ==
- Der Grenzbaum. Bonn, 1939.
- Review of Johannes Haller's Der Eintritt der Germanen in die Geschichte, in: Zeitschrift der Savigny-Stiftung für Rechtsgeschichte, 1940.
- Essay for the Festgabe für Heinrich Himmler (i.e. Honoring Collection for Heinrich Himmler), which included among others as authors Werner Best and Reinhard Höhn, published by Wilhelm Stuckart, L. C. Wittich Verlag, Darmstadt 1941.

== Bibliography ==
- Longerich, Peter (2012). Heinrich Himmler: A Life. Oxford; New York: Oxford University Press. ISBN 978-0-19-959232-6.
