= Ernst Zipperer =

German artist (b. 1888, d. 1982)

Ernst Gustav Zipperer (born 23 February 1888 in Ulm; died 26 May 1982 in Heilbronn) was a German painter and printmaker.

== Life ==
=== Parental home, education and World War I ===
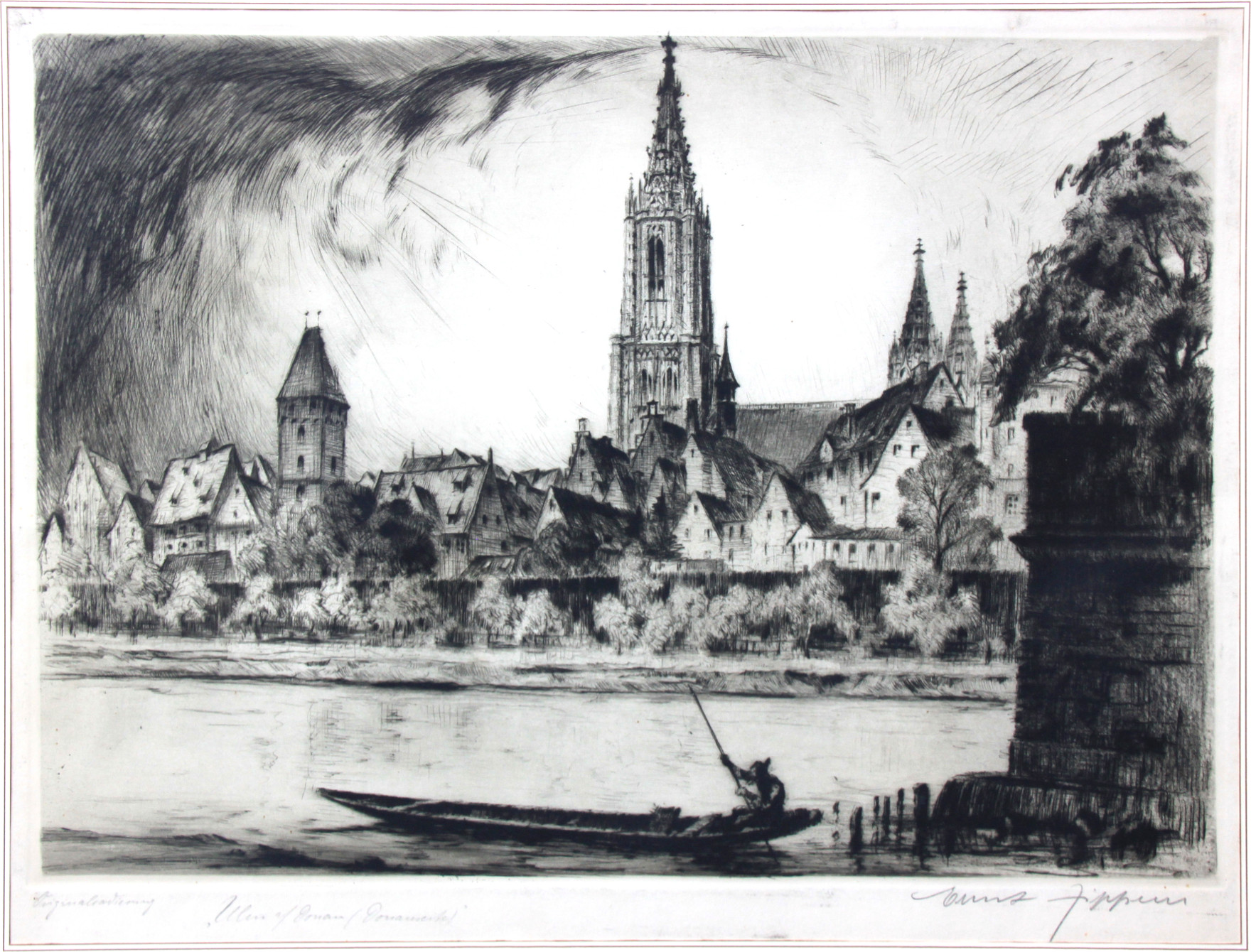
Ulm on the Danube, drypoint, 1925

Ernst Gustav Zipperer was born in Ulm in 1888 as the son of the upholsterer Ernst Hermann Zipperer and his wife Friederike. Zipperer and his younger brother Max grew up in the immediate vicinity of Ulm Minster. After his schooling in Ulm from 1894 to 1902, at his father’s request, he followed in his footsteps and trained as a saddler and upholsterer. After passing his journeyman's examination in 1905 and working both in the family business and for a time for another employer, he followed his inclination for art and attended the arts and crafts school in Hanover from 1907 to 1909. He then transferred to Paul Heinrich’s academy in Hildburghausen for further qualification (1909 – 1910). From October 1910 to November 1911, he did his military service as a volunteer in Neu-Ulm. He then attended the arts and crafts school in Kassel where he obtained a qualification as drawing teacher for secondary schools and teacher training institutions (1911 – 1913). Following that, he attended the Academy of Fine Arts in Munich for one term as a student of Heinrich Wölfflin. In March 1914, Ernst Zipperer took up his first post as trainee drawing teacher at Berlin-Lichterfelde Grammar School. However, this was interrupted due to being drafted into war service in Masuria, East Prussia in August 1914.

In World War I, Ernst Zipperer served as an officer. He was seriously wounded near Minsk in Russia in 1915 due to a head shot and lost his left eye. As a consequence, he underwent treatment at the Eye Hospital in Stuttgart for a period of one year. As a result of his injuries, he suffered from severe headaches and spells of dizziness as well as kidney problems for the rest of his life.

In June 1917, he returned to Berlin-Lichterfelde Grammar School and qualified as drawing teacher in September. From October 1917 to September 1918, he served as district officer in Rastenburg in East Prussia.

=== Berlin ===
In 1918, Ernst Zipperer married Elisabeth Nestler (born 3 November 1894 in Hildburghausen; died 5 June 1977 in Heilbronn). Following their wedding, he took up the post of art teacher at Hermann von Helmholtz Grammar School in Berlin-Schönefeld. The couple had three children: Ernst Wilhelm (1919 – 2005), Gisela (1921 – 1928) and Vera Charlotte (born 1931). In 1920, he moved to Berlin-Friedenau Grammar School where he taught until 1940. There, until 1940, he influenced a whole generation of young people. His pupils included persons such as the resistance fighter Friedrich Justus Perels, the columnist Friedrich Luft and the politicians Egon Bahr and Peter Lorenz. Zipperer was deeply respected by his pupils and many remained in close contact with him until his death. He enjoyed a deep friendship with Helmut Ammann who became a prominent sculptor, painter and graphic artist.

Ernst Zipperer’s first years of teaching in Berlin also marked the beginning of his first major creative phase which lasted until 1940. During these two decades, Zipperer produced a significant body of work. He traveled extensively throughout Germany and to various European countries in order to study and produce art works. His preferred technique at the time was drypoint etching and with this technique he became known both in and outside Germany.

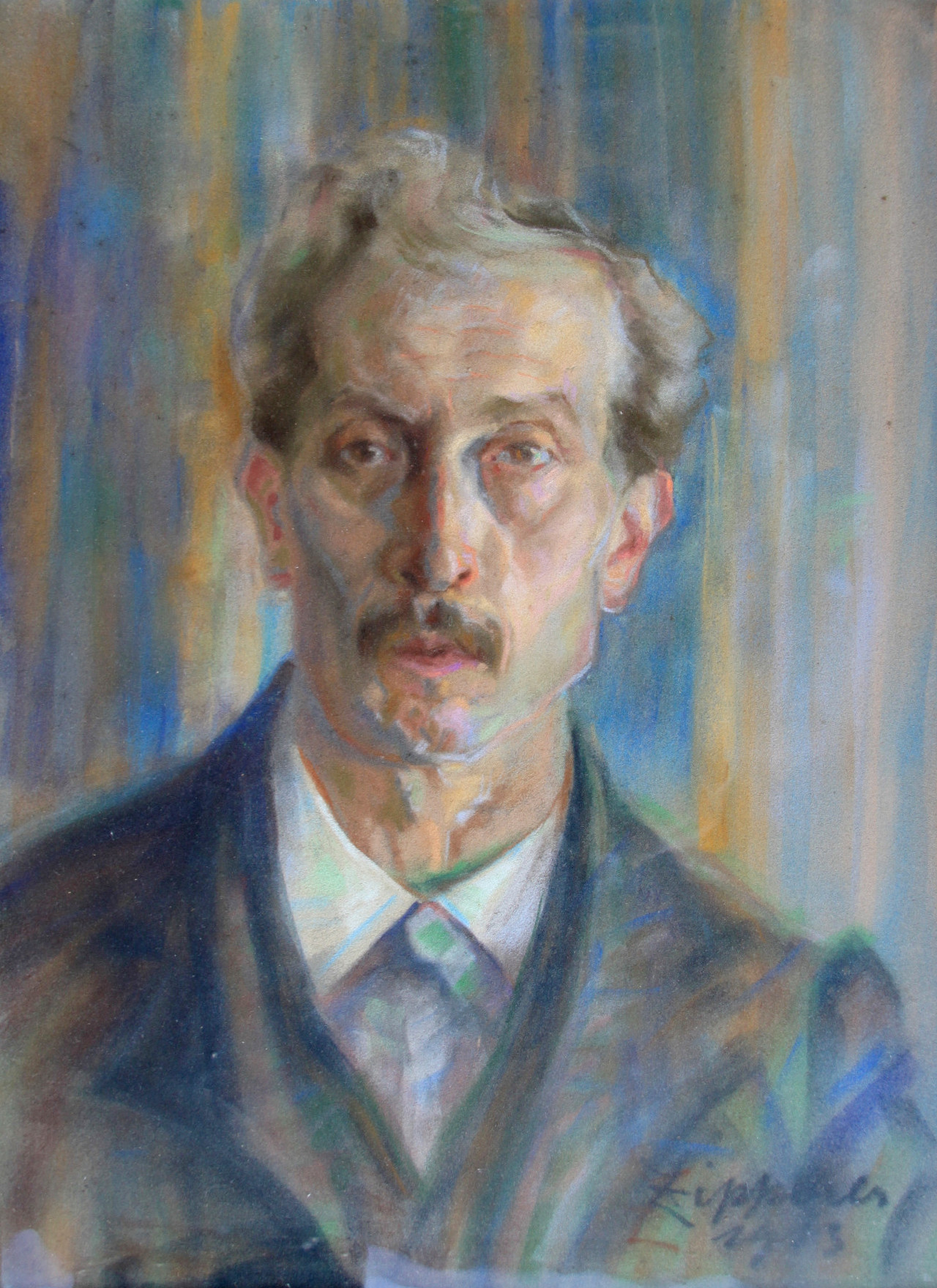
Ernst Hermann Zipperer (father), pastel, 1913

In Berlin, Zipperer developed friendships with the artists Heinrich Zille and Max Liebermann. He was particularly close to the sculptor August Gaul, in whose house he lived for almost one year in 1917. Gaul appreciated and sponsored Ernst Zipperer. Through Gaul, a member of the Executive Committee of the Berlin Secession, Zipperer came into contact with Berlin arts world.

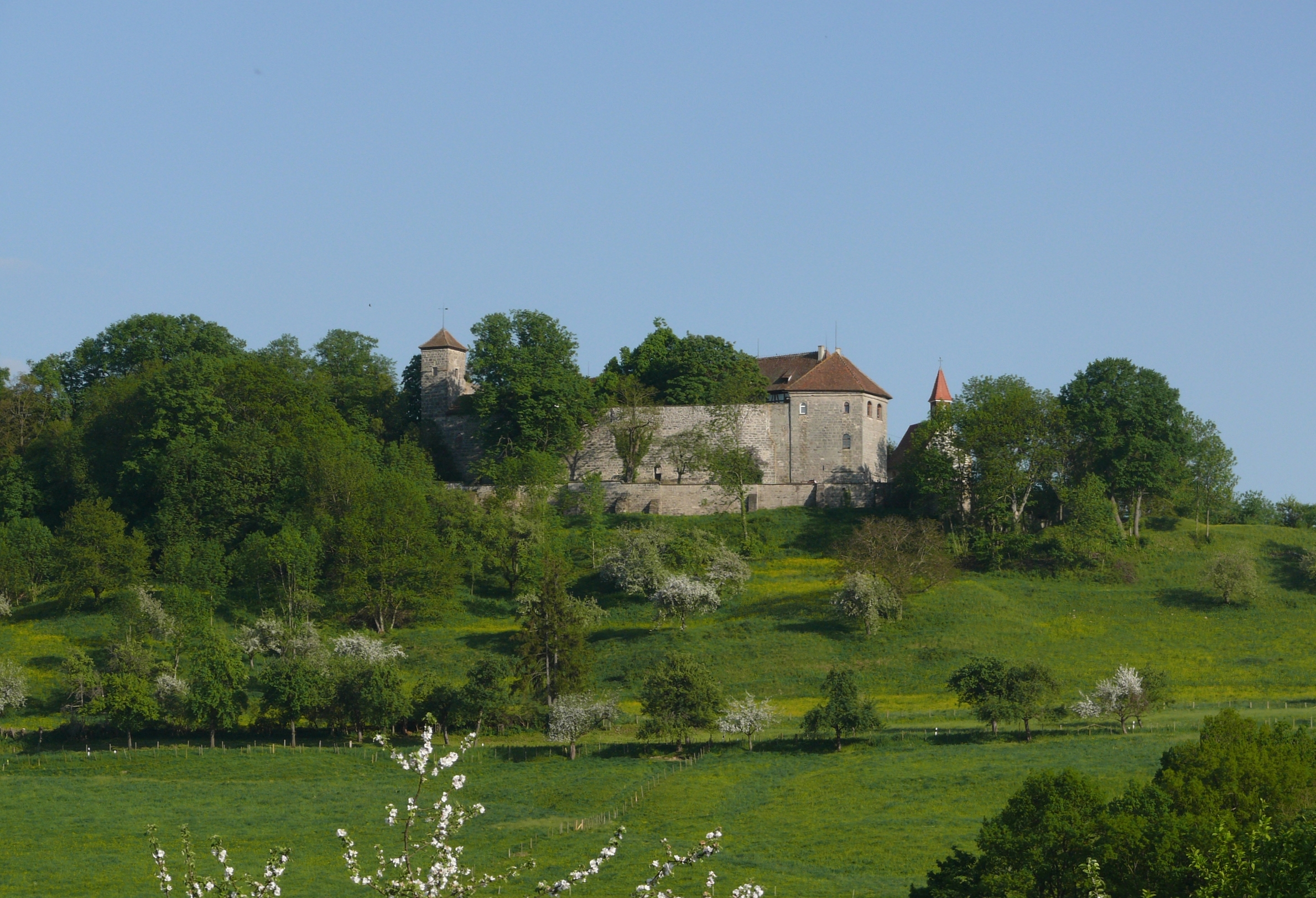
Tannenburg near Bühlertann

In 1931, Zipperer bought Tannenburg Castle, a castle dating back to the Staufer period, with its farm estate near the village of Bühlertann in Ellwangen District (now Schwäbisch Hall District) in north-east Württemberg. He leased the associated farm estate and continued to work in Berlin.

=== Tannenburg and Bühlertann, Württemberg ===
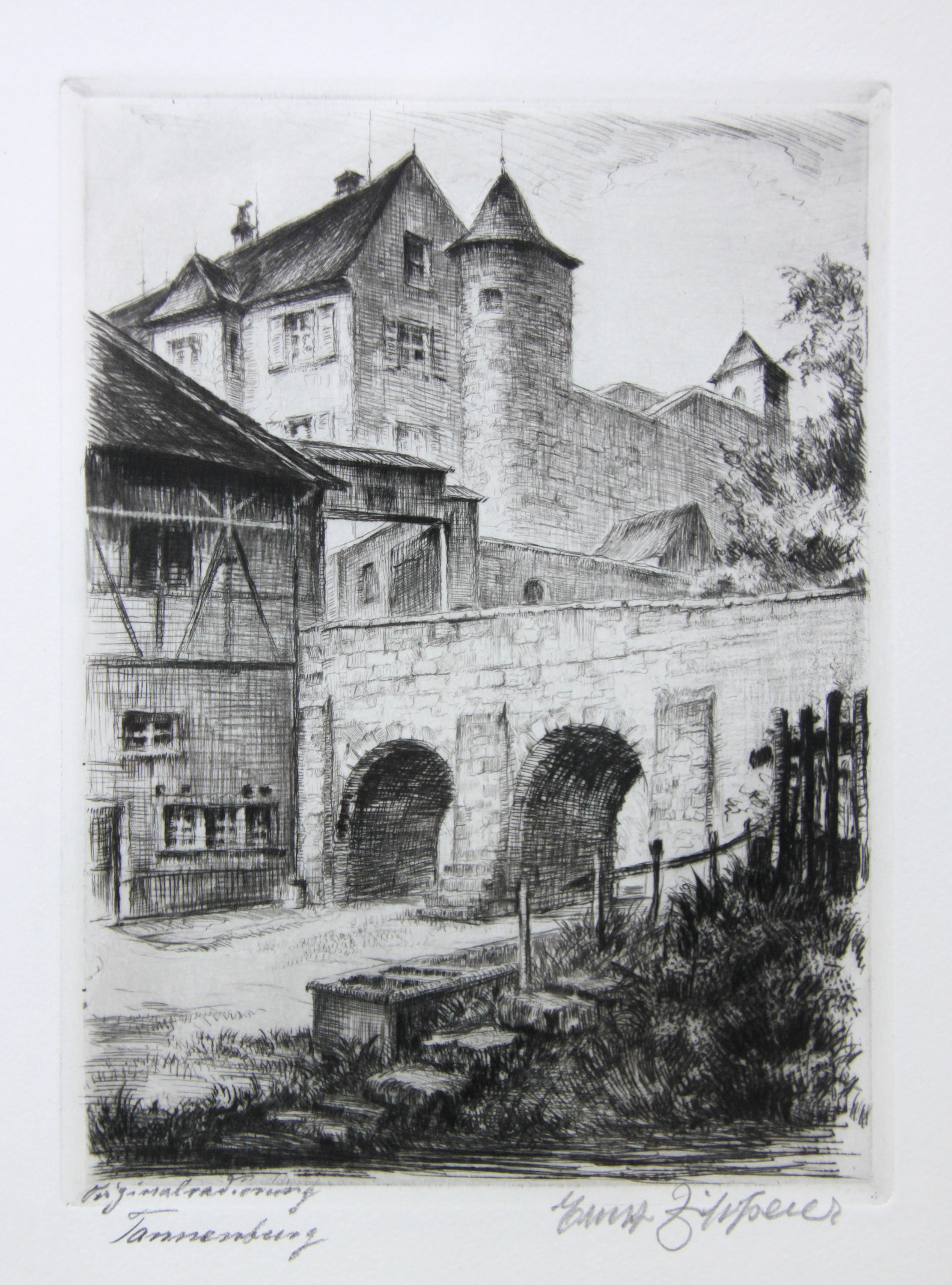
Tannenburg, Drypoint, 1940

As a disabled war veteran, Ernst Zipperer retired from teaching in 1940 and moved from Berlin to Tannenburg Castle. Under extremely difficult conditions, he managed the farm estate until the return of his son Ernst Wilhelm from the war and captivity (1940 – 1948). In 1951, he handed over the castle and the farm estate to his son and, in 1963, left the castle to move to the home of his daughter Vera in Bühlertann. With the deterioration of his remaining eye’s sight, he had to give up his artistic work in 1972. He spent the last years of his life at the home of his daughter who had since moved to Flein near Heilbronn. Ernst Gustav Zipperer died on May 26, 1982, at the age of 94 and was buried in Bühlertann.

== Work ==
The artistic work of Ernst Zipperer covers his early work until 1918, the creative phase in Berlin (1918-1940) and his late work (1950-1972). According to the current status, about 1,300 works have been documented.

=== Early work (until 1917) ===
Already as a child and during his apprenticeship, Ernst Zipperer showed a particular talent for drawing. During this period, many drawings and sketches evolved, but most of them are now lost. From the period of his artistic education in Hanover, Kassel and Munich, numerous studies on perspective and shadowing as well as technical drawings still exist.

Under the influence of Prof. Heubach in Hanover Zipperer turned its attention to the drawing of architecture. At the same time he created landscapes, portraits, nudes, ornaments and still lifes, which he mainly executed as pencil drawings, rarely as watercolors.

During his wartime deployment in Russia (1914 – 1915), his artistic talent expressed itself in a wide variety of ways. Due to a lack of photographic resources, he sketched military combats which were used in connection with strategic decisions. In the trenches, he sketched portraits of fellow soldiers and officers as a memento to be sent to their families. Two small drawings from this period are extant.

His severe war injury was followed by a one-year convalescence period at the Eye Hospital in Stuttgart. After regaining the sight of his remaining eye, he produced many art works, while still in hospital. In numerous sketches and drawings, he focused on people who showed considerable signs of what they had gone through during the war. Some pictures of that time clearly show the influence of Heinrich Zille.

=== Berlin Phase (1918 – 1940) ===
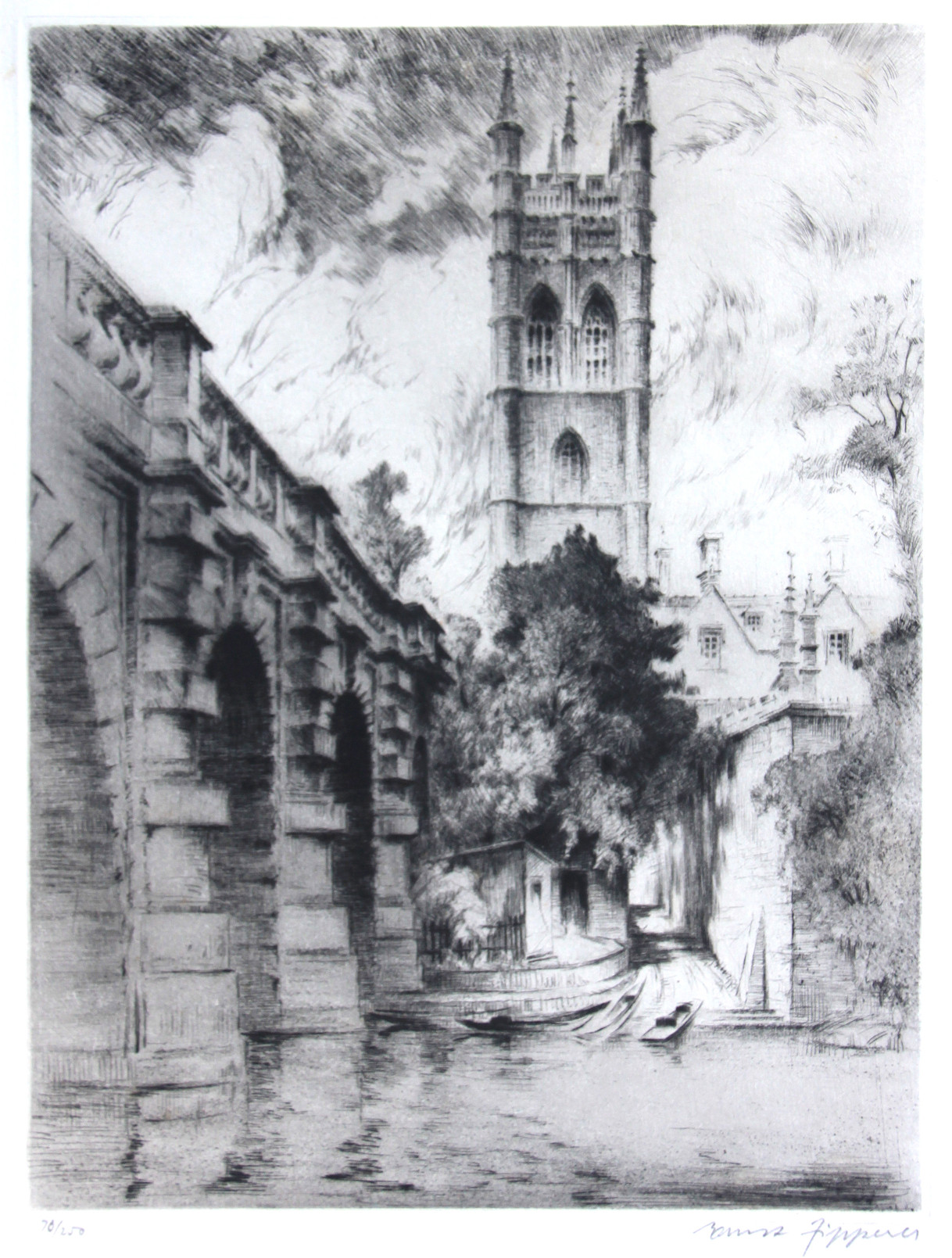
Magdalen Tower, Oxford, Drypoint, 1925

In 1919 Ernst Zipperer discovered drypoint etching for himself. He drew and etched castles, city views, churches, landscapes, portraits, flowers and animals - mostly in small to medium format. The main topic in this phase was architecture. He found more than 40 motifs alone in his hometown of Ulm. On his numerous travels he made pencil drawings as preliminary studies for the later etchings.

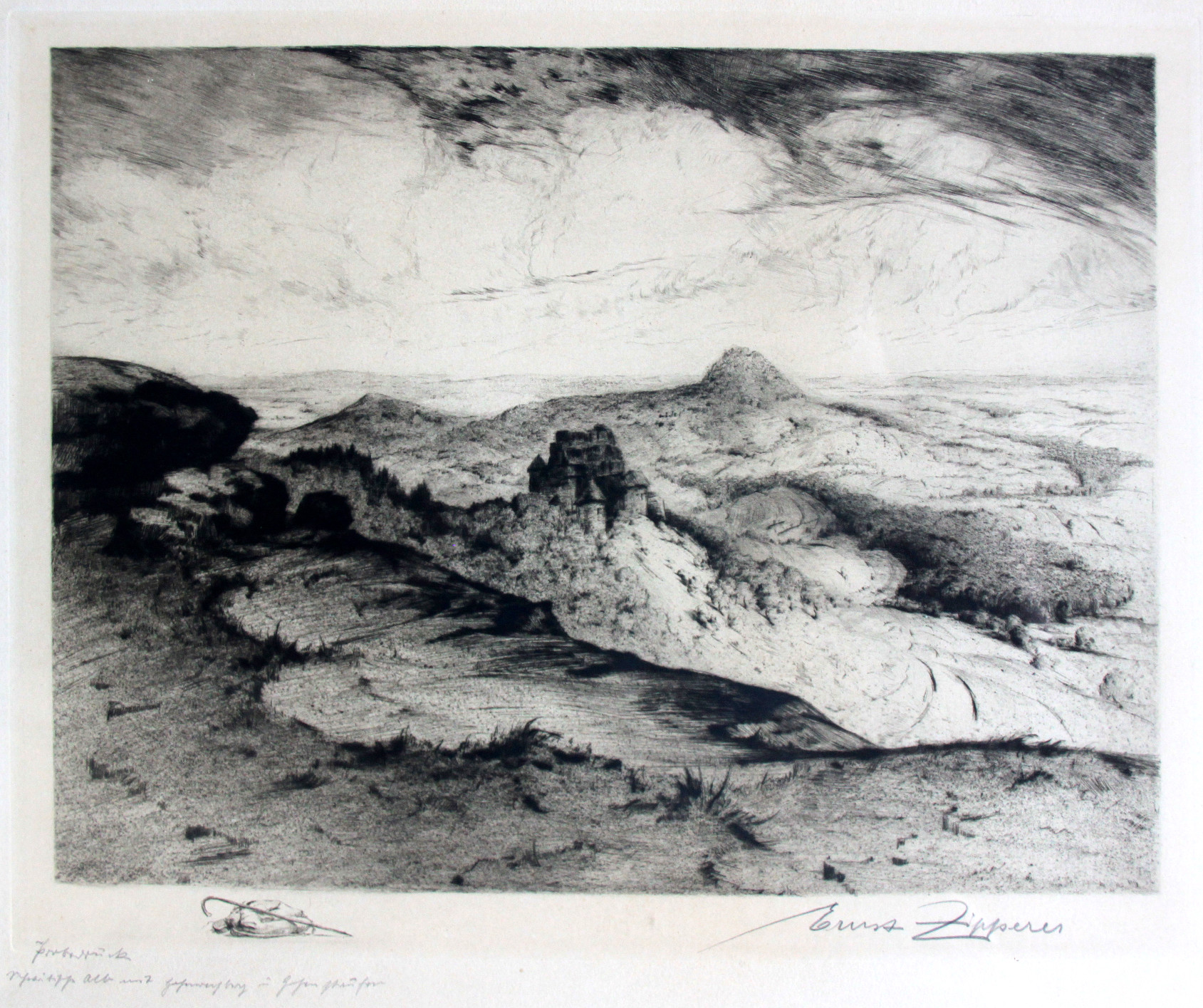
Swabian Alb with Hohenrechberg and Hohenstaufen, drypoint, 1925

A total of more than 300 drypoint etchings were created, which were characterized by careful area division, well thought-out image composition and formal design ability. Added to this was the perspective effect of his pictures, which he succeeded convincingly despite one-eyed. Zipperer achieved an increase in spatiality and expression by drawing inspiration from Chiaroscuro. Also characteristic was the staffage found in many etchings, which discreetly guides the eye of the beholder.

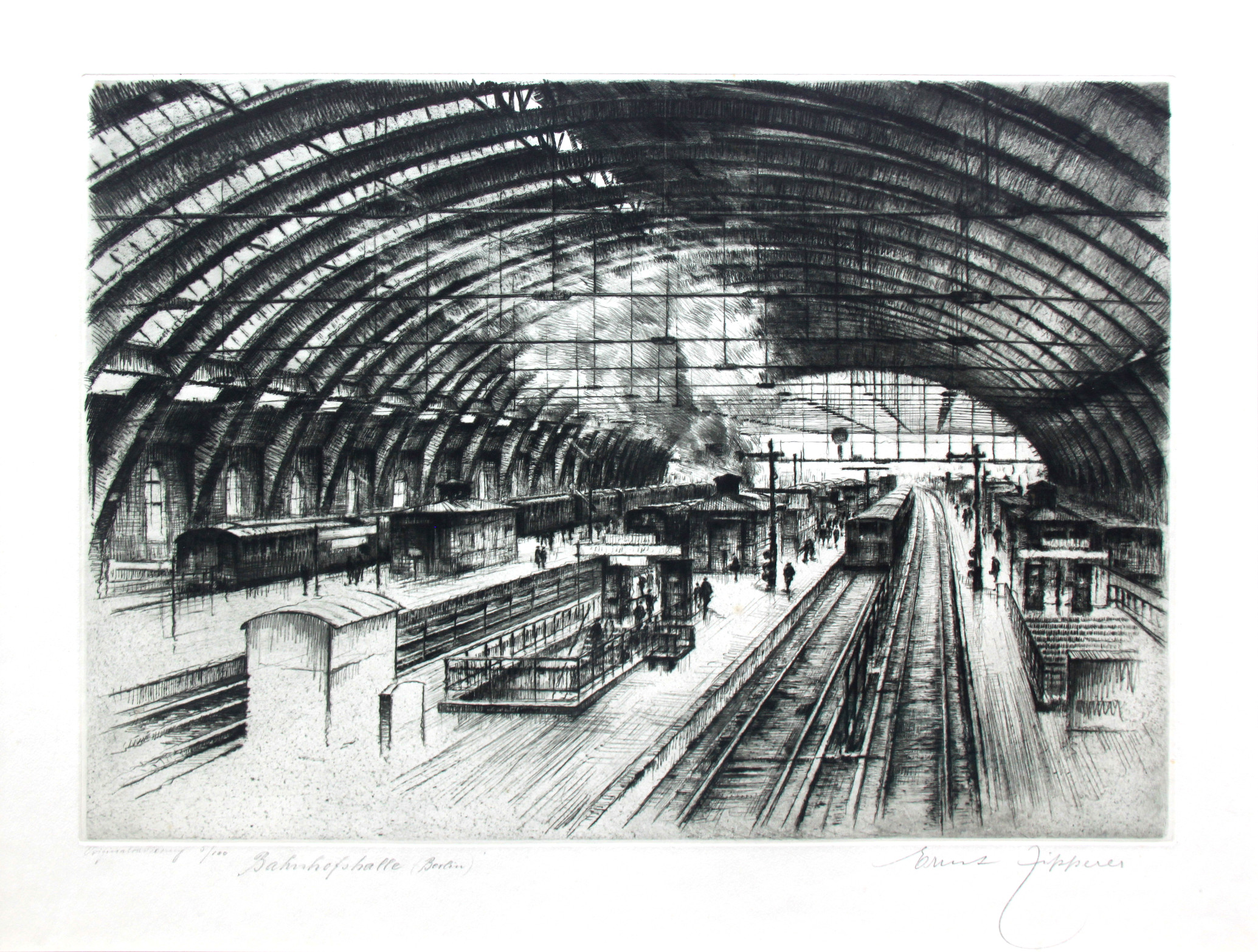
Station Hall Berlin, drypoint, 1923

"The many moving strokes, which sometimes had an almost shimmering effect - combined with a strict mold design - that was typical Zipperer". But he was not just concerned with the reproduction of reality. "Zipperer did not represent dead objects, but things that have a destiny and therefore life." Rather, he sought the creative translation of his perception into the artistic. "He knew how to express what weaves the visible in emotional mood".

That Zipperer was also "a portrait drypoint etcher of rank and depth" is shown by his portraits, which he executed as pencil drawings and etchings. During training in Kassel he had received an award for portrait drawing.

In the mid-twenties, Zipperer occasionally colored etchings by hand. As towards the end of the decade increasingly colored etchings were required, he had many of his motifs in color print.

Numerous etchings were commissioned by cities, companies, art dealers or private individuals. A large part of the etchings was published by various publishers as art cards and sold through the art trade.

Zipperer worked for decades with the copper printing company Wilhelm Schneider in Berlin, where the copper plates were stored. A larger number of plates were lost during the Second World War and in the subsequent turmoil or got into unauthorized hands. This explains that pirate prints came into circulation as a result.

With his drypoint etchings Ernst Zipperer became known in Europe and America - less by exhibitions than by the very successful distribution of his pictures by some art publishers and numerous art shops in Germany and abroad. (Note: Copperplate printing company, art publishers and art dealers (selection): Kupferdruckerei und Kunstverlag Wilhelm Schneider & Co, Berlin / Kunstverlag Balkheimer, Ulm (Künstlerkarten) / Kunstverlag J.C. Blumenberg, Heiligenhafen und Lübeck / Kunstverlag Carl Büchle, Berlin / Kunstverlag W. Frey, Fine Art Dealer, Berlin / Kunstverlag Hanfstaengel’s Nachfolger, Berlin / Kunstverlag Carl Lorenz, Berlin-Tempelhof / Kunstverlag Katholisches Pfarramt Sprendlingen (art cards) / Kunstverlag A. Wolpers & Co., Berlin, Bad Homburg, Bad Salzuflen / Kunsthaus Frey, Ulm / Kunsthaus Göbel, Ulm / Kunsthandlung Ernst Hühn, Kassel / Kunsthandlung Franz Xaver Müller, Würzburg / Bilderhaus Alois Raible, Ellwangen/Jagst / Kunsthandlung Richter, Schwäbisch Hall / Buchhandlung der Soldiner Zeitung, Soldin) In addition to pencil drawings and etchings, Zipperer began working with pastels in this phase, sometimes in larger formats. Also some sketches in different techniques, which served for demonstration purposes in the classroom, are preserved from this time.

Ernst Zipperer’s wife Elisabeth contributed considerably to his work since she kept him free from the burden of day-to-day activities. She handled business correspondence with the copperplate printers, art dealers and prospective buyers. Likewise, she helped to organize the countless visits of art lovers.

=== Creative break (1941 – 1949) ===
During World War II and the immediately succeeding years, Ernst Zipperer’s artistic activities almost came to a complete stop. The difficult conditions of everyday life at the castle left no scope for art.

=== Late work (1950 – 1972) ===
After the turmoil of the war and the handover of Tannenburg to his son, Ernst Zipperer was able to devote himself entirely to his art. He left the era of drypoint behind him and entered a new intense phase of artistic creation. The late work of the artist is characterized by experimentation and new ideas. For Zipperer, the movement runs along the art-historical development of his time from realistic-naturalistic to abstract-reductionist representation. At the same time, the realistic and abstract modes of expression do not stand for a closed stage of artistic recognition. Rather, both exist side by side. Abstract depictions are again followed by a landscape or a bouquet of flowers. He is always looking for "ground under his feet," as he called it.

It is a further thematic arc that spans the "complexity of its meaningful images". In many cases, these are already well-known motifs that recur again and again - often in a reduced form - trees in the landscape, a ravine and clouds above; especially the clouds occupied him throughout his life. In addition, there are themes such as peace and quiet, but also division and destruction, which he translates abstractly. "Everything you can think of, you can also draw", the artist described his own spectrum in later years.

Increasingly employed Ernst Zipperer, who was influenced Protestant in the parental home, but in his old age increasingly took up Catholic thought, religious and biblical themes: The Psalms, the story of creation, Job and the Gospel of John. He also transformed the music of Bach, Mozart and Tchaikovsky into colors and forms.

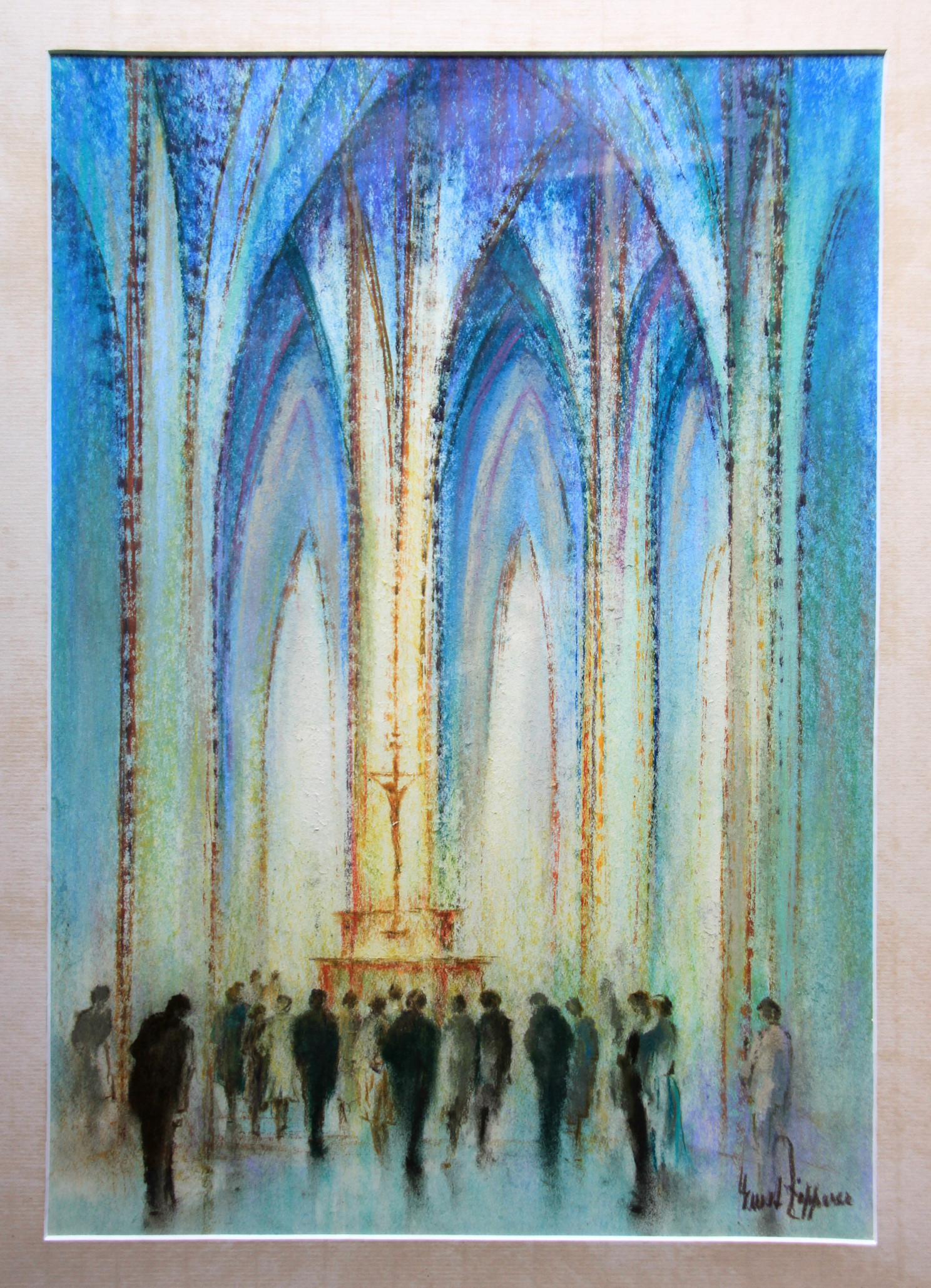
Before God, all men are equal, oil pastels, 1959

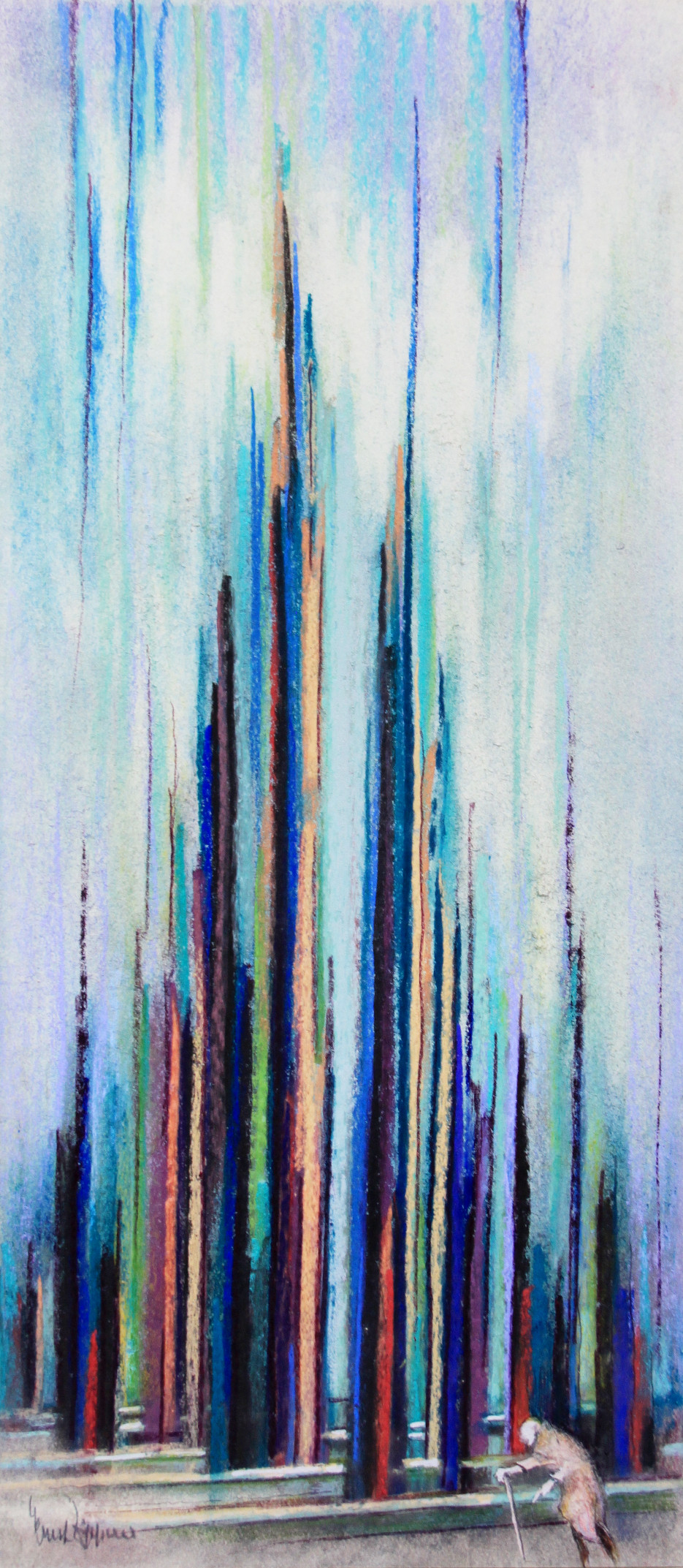
The old man in the new world, oil pastels, 1967

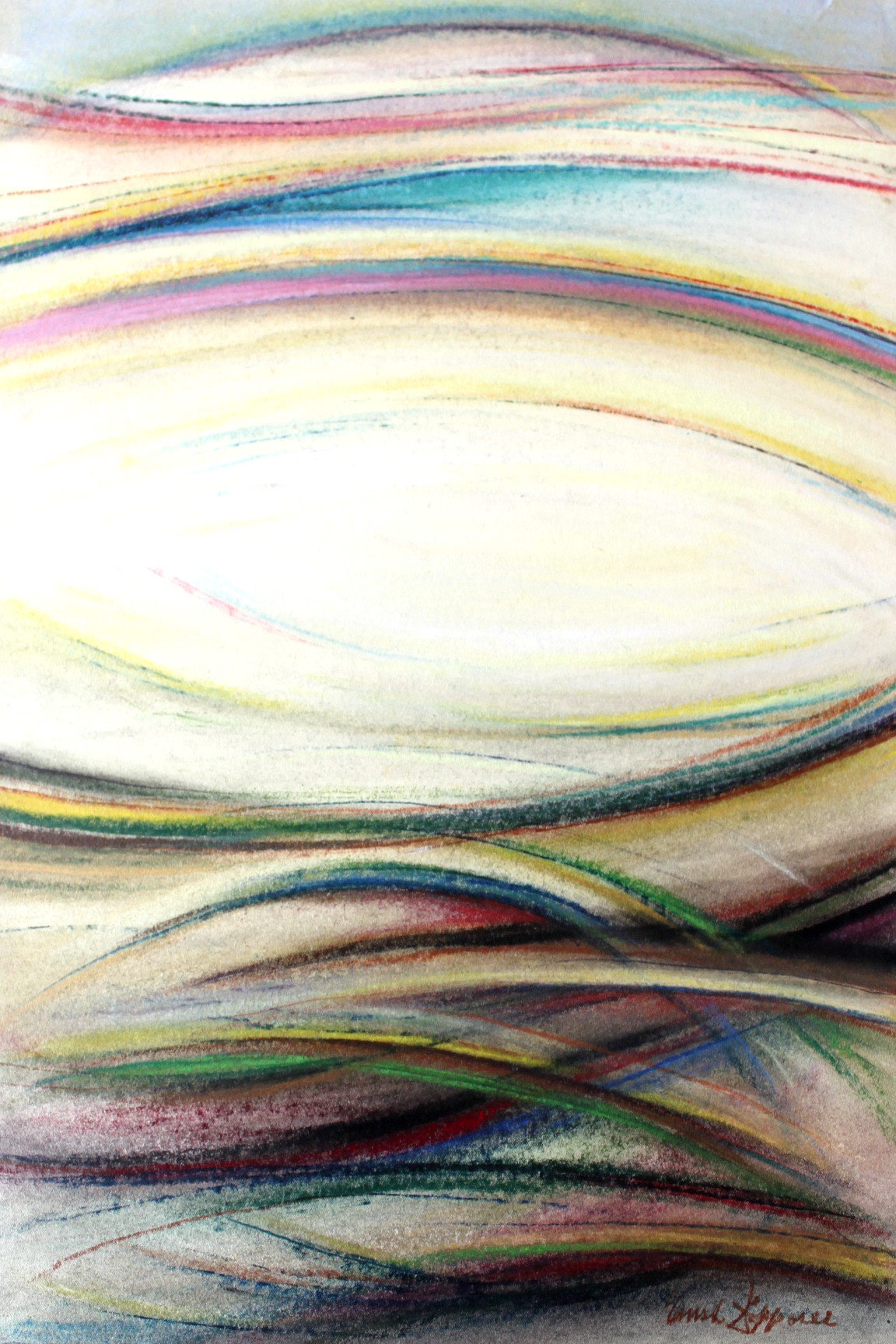
Heaven and earth, oil pastels, 1965

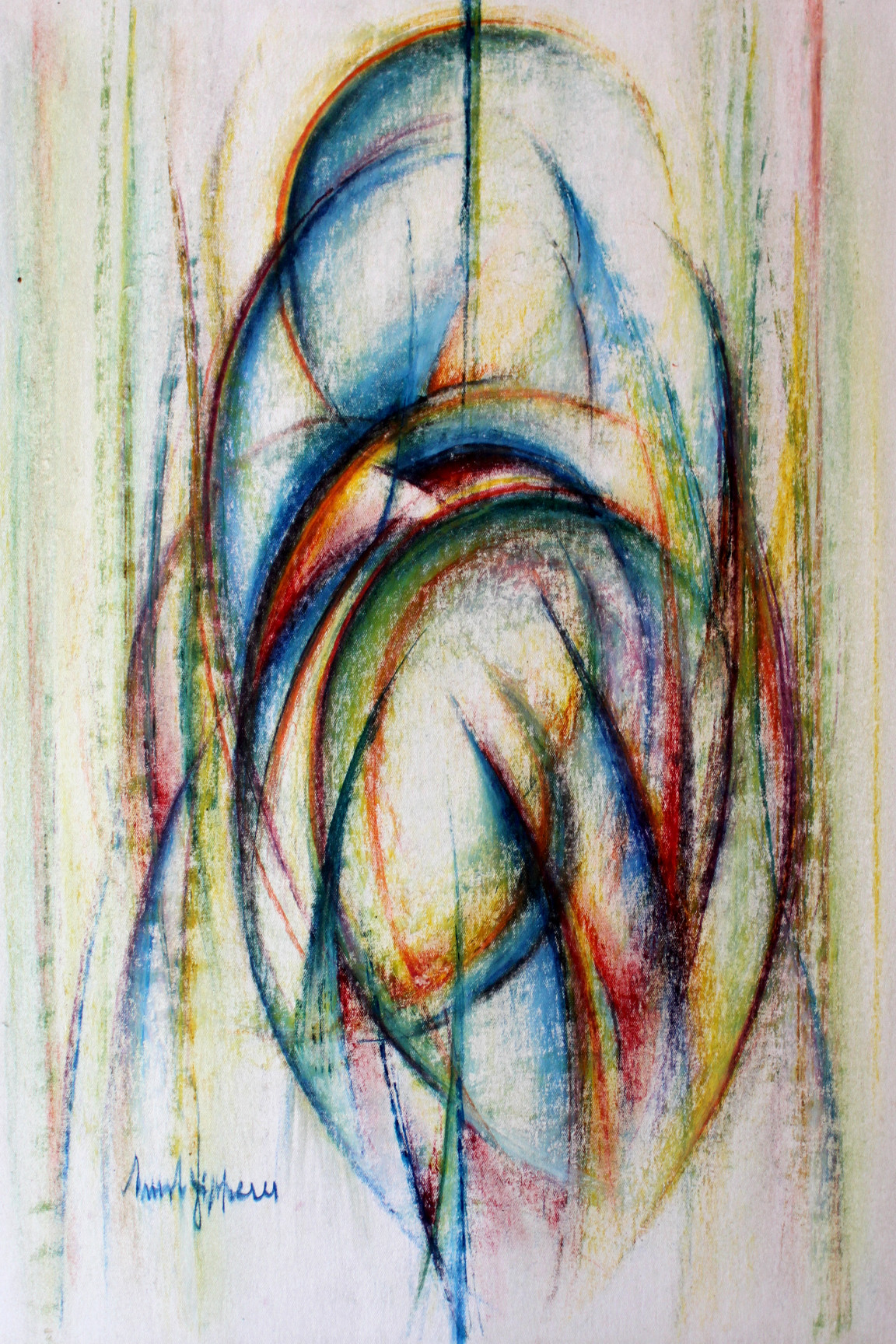
Unfolding, oil pastels, 1965

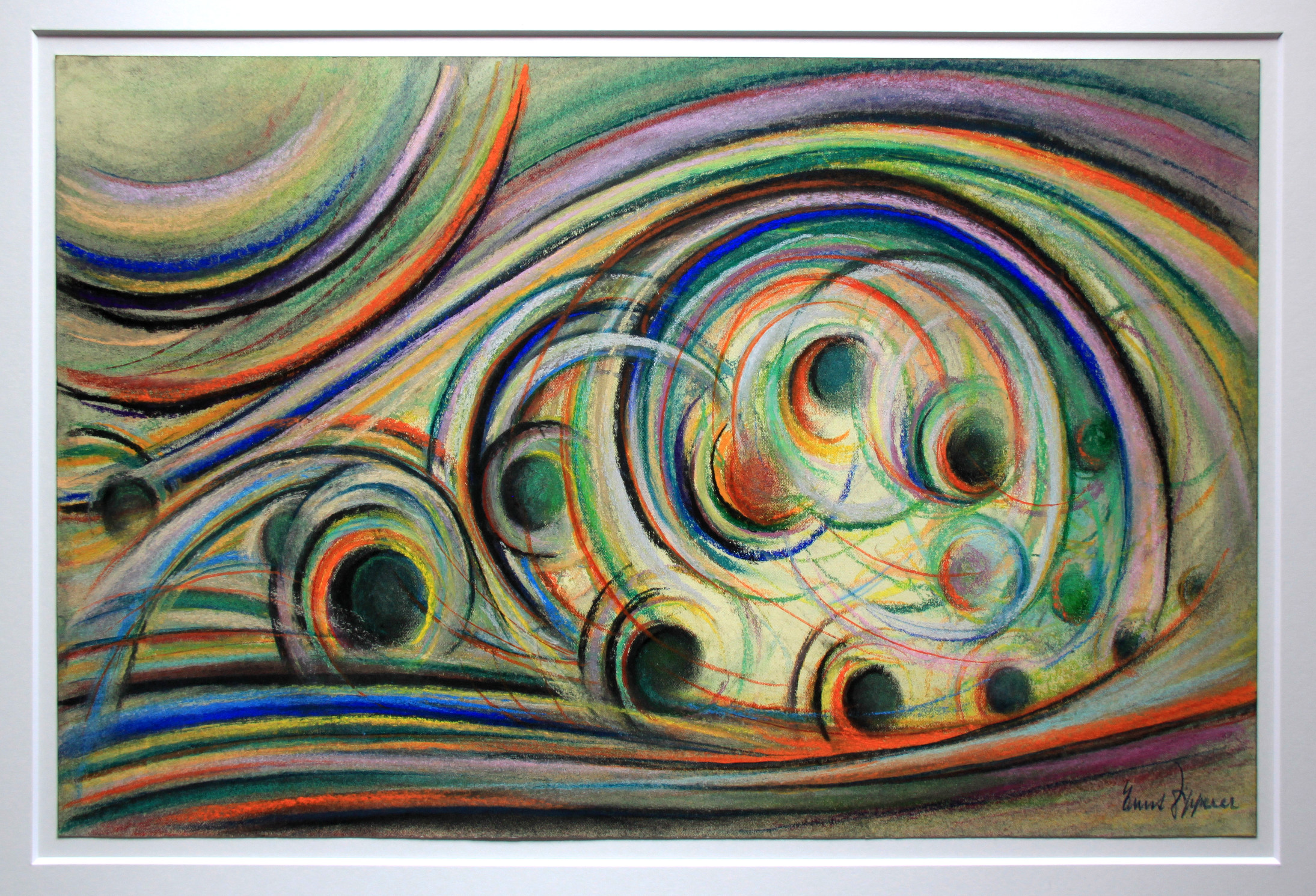
Development, pastel, 1967

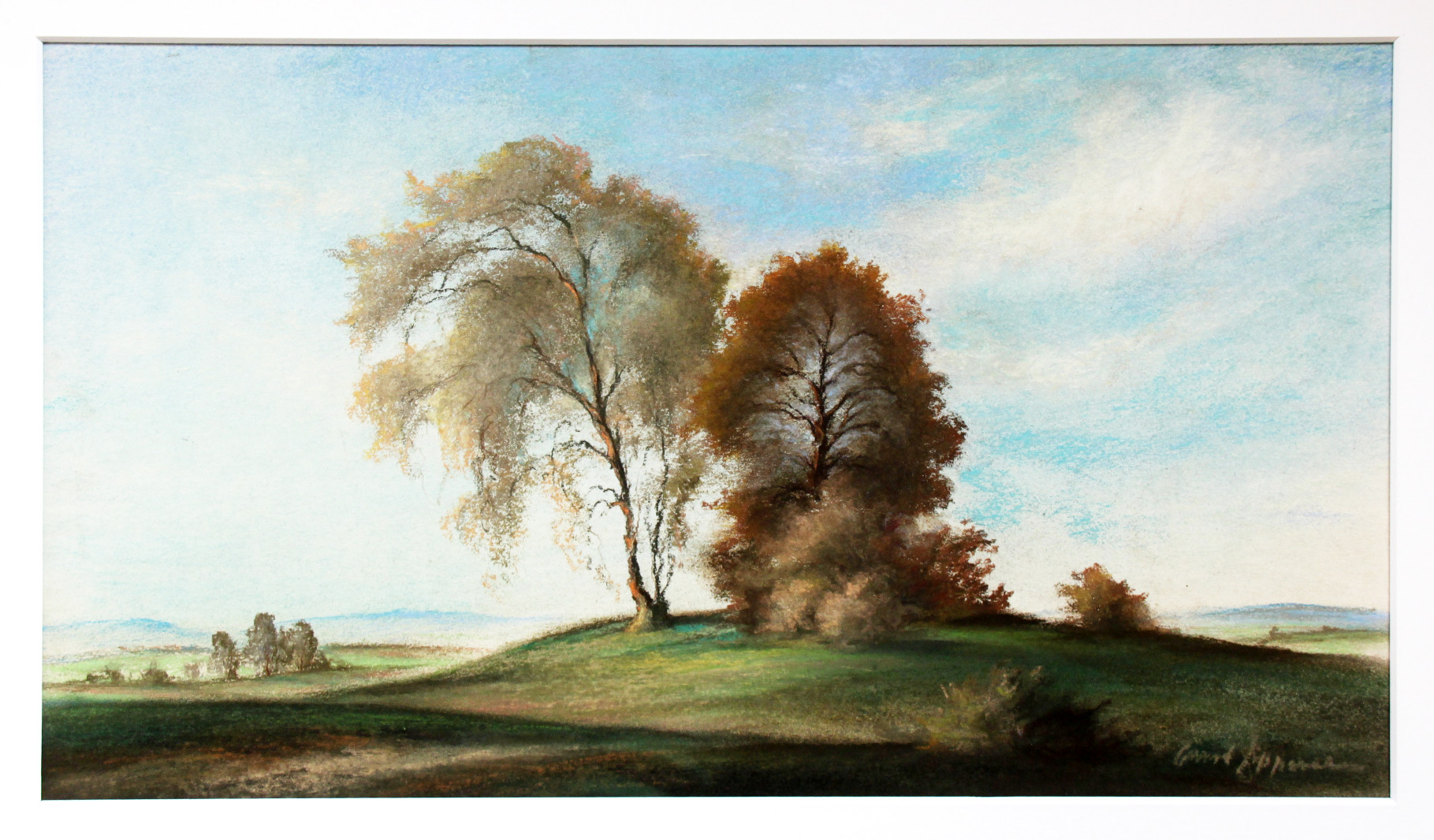
Landscape, pastel, 1964

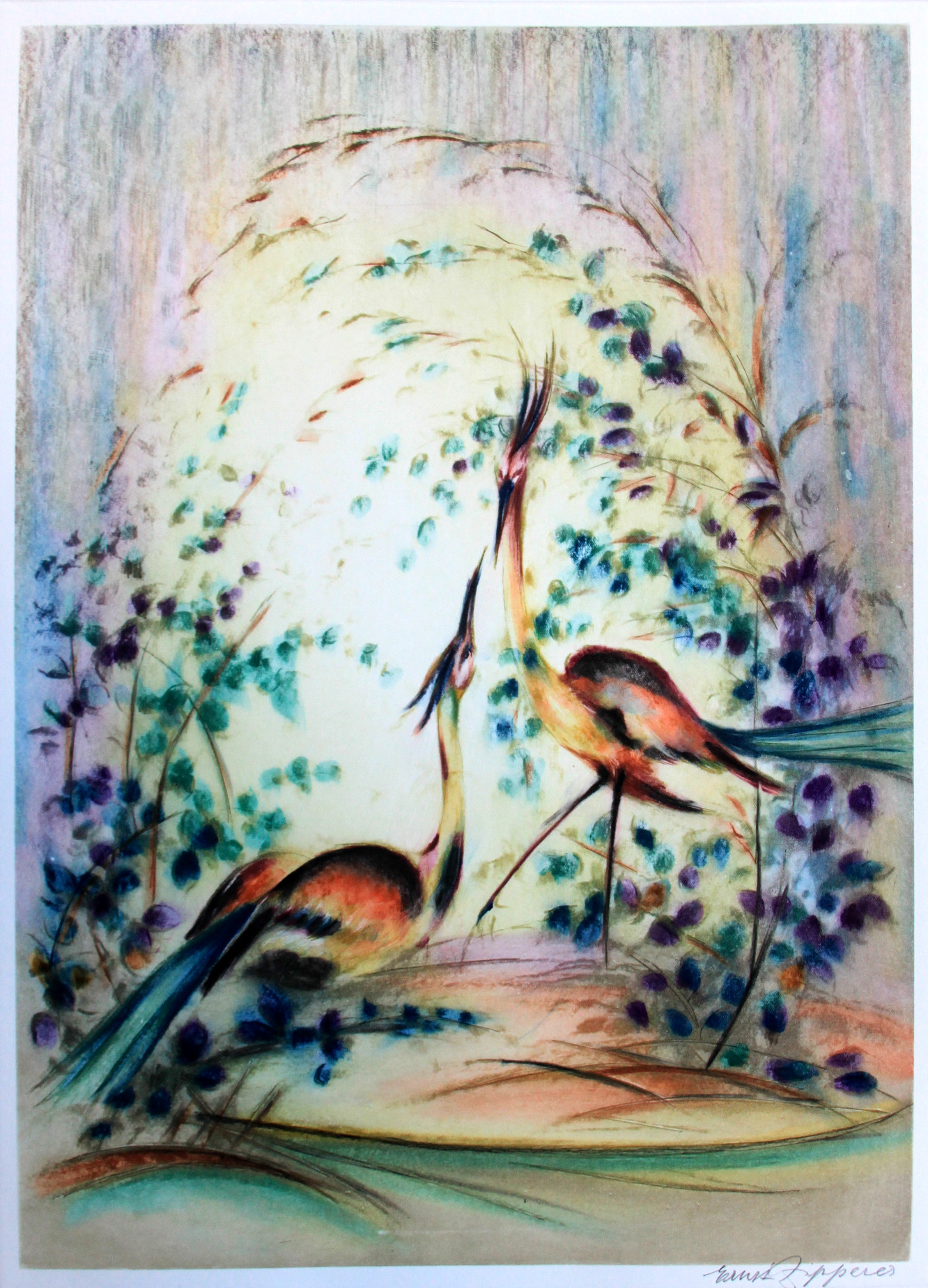
Dialogue, Heliogravure, 1958

Ernst Zipperer found adequate materials for expressing his imagination and mystical inwardness in pastels, oil pastels, tempera, and oil paint. His work ranges from cautious and mindful to powerful and dynamic.

In the gravure printing of the heliogravure Zipperer did in 1955 in cooperation with his Berlin printing on new ways on how he could spread some of his large-sized pastel paintings in large numbers. It is a fine-printing process that transfers the original to a copper plate in a complex photo-chemical process. The heliogravure makes a very differentiated reproduction of halftones possible and thus creates a wealth of color power. The prints, also known as hand copper, met with great interest in the art trade and in the personal environment of the artist. They were affordable, allowing a wider audience access to this art.

There is not a single self-portrait by Ernst Zipperer. However, he draws a picture especially in his late works: In it he shows how he sees the visible and invisible world with his inner eye.

In addition to some extensive, there are many smaller private collections with works by Ernst Zipperer. Individual works are held in German museums or municipal archives. Ernst Zipperer’s artistic estate is managed by his daughter Vera Prior and grandson Lothar Zipperer.

== Exhibitions (selection) ==
October 1927 in Offenburg, Die Kunstausstellung im Bürgersaal, Offenburger Zeitung, October 15, 1927

1927 in Braunschweig, Kunstgewerbemesse Elisabeth Osterloh

October 1929, Der Radierer Ernst Zipperer, Buchhandlung der Soldiner Zeitung, October 3, 1929

April 1931 in Ulm, Zipperer-Ausstellung im Kunsthaus Göbel, Ulmer Tagblatt, April 16, 1931

September 1931, Ausstellung von Zipperer-Radierungen in der Kunsthandlung Karl Balkheimer, Ulm

October 1933 in Ellwangen, Zur Ausstellung von Radierungen Ernst Zipperers, Ipf- und Jagstzeitung / Ellwanger Tagblatt, October 28, 1933

July 1963 in Ellwangen, Ausstellung im Bilderhaus Alois Raible, Aalener Volkszeitung/Ipf- und Jagstzeitung, July 6, 1963

April 1972 in Bühlertann, Ein Stiller im Lande, Kreissparkasse Bühlertann, Haller Tagblatt, April 22, 1972

February 1978 in Ulm, Ulmer Motive – ins Künstlerische übersetzt, Ausstellung im Kunsthaus Frey, Ulmer Zeitung, February 11, 1978

June 2002 in Bühlertann, Heimatverein Bühlertann, Haller Tagblatt, June 28, 2002

April 2006 in Dresden, Villa Eschenbach zeigt allerlei Kunst um das Monetäre, Leipziger Volkszeitung, April 24, 2006

October 2010 in Nersingen-Oberfahlheim bei Ulm, Alte Ulmer Ansichten, Radierungen von Ernst Zipperer, Südwestpresse Ulm, October 15, 2010

June 2013 in Bühlertann, Einäugiger Blick auf die Heimat, Heimatverein Bühlertann, Hohenloher Tagblatt, June 28, 2013

June 2016 in Bühlertann, Zipperer-Werke im Rathaus, Heimatverein Bühlertann, Haller Tagblatt, June 23, 2016

July 2018 in Schwäbisch Hall, Ernst Zipperer (1888 – 1982) – Auf den Spuren seiner Kunst, Hällisch-Fränkisches Museum Schwäbisch Hall, Haller Tagblatt, July 17, 2018

== Bibliography ==
=== Sources / Figures - chronological ===
Ernst Zipperer’s personnel file; Berlin-Friedenau Grammar School (01.10.1918 – 31.03.1940). Berlin State Archives, A Rep. 041-08, Berlin-Schöneberg District Office, serial no. 894, [220 pages].

Kunstverlag Carl Büchle. Berlin-Tempelhof. 1925 [publisher’s catalog].

Original-Graphik. Berlin: Verlag Hanfstaengel’s Nachfolger. June 1925 [publisher’s catalog].

Kunsthandel. Fachblatt für die Interessen des gesamten Kunsthandels und verwandter Berufszweige. Frankfurt/Oder: Kunstverlag Trowitsch & Sohn. Vol. 22 (1930), No. 18, 2 September issue, p. 202.

Ernst Zipperer’s personnel file. Berlin State Archives, A Rep. 243-04, Reich Chamber of Fine Arts – Berlin State Administration (approx. 1933 – 1945), serial no. 10132, [19 pages].

Enrilo Kalender 1936. Issued by Enrilo GmbH Berlin. Leipzig: Richard Hummel-Verlag. 1936 [calendar].

Original-Graphik. Berlin: Verlag Hanfstaengel’s Nachfolger. December 1942 [publisher’s catalog].

Zipperer, Ernst: [autobiographical notes]. Bühlertann-Tannenburg. May 1953. [These hand-written notes in a notebook are supplemented with some ink drawings. They comprise more than 150 pages and are privately held.].

Kunstverlag A. Wolpers & Co. Katalog-Nachtrag 1961. Bad Salzuflen [publisher’s catalog].

Kunstverlag J. C. Blumenberg. Farbige Radierungen. Lübeck. 1963 [publisher’s catalog].

Kunstverlag Kupferdruckerei Wilhelm Schneider & Co. Berlin. 1963 [publisher’s catalog].

Kunstverlag Carl Lorenz. Berlin-Tempelhof. No year specified [publisher’s catalog].

=== Literature ===
==== Entries in dictionaries and biographical reference works - chronological ====
Zipperer, Ernst. In: Nagel, Gert K.: Schwäbisches Künstlerlexikon: Vom Barock bis zur Gegenwart. Munich: Kunst & Antiquitäten. 1986, p. 131.

Zipperer, Ernst. In: Allgemeines Künstlerlexikon. Die Bildenden Künstler aller Zeiten und Völker. Bio-bibliographical index, Vol. 10. Edited by Günther Meißner. Munich, Leipzig: K. G. Saur. 2000, p. 751.

==== Self-published writings ====
Klein, Erwin / Staudacher, Bernhard: Die Geschichte der Tannenburg und ihrer Besitzer. Summary of a lecture held in Bühlertannhalle, Bühlertann, on Friday November 13, 2009. Bühlertann: Heimatverein. 2010.

==== Non-self-published writings (in chronological sequence) ====
Ziegler, Theo: Radierkunst einst und jetzt. In: The Illustrated Weekly, Deutsch-Amerika. New York: The States-Herold Corporation. (1924) No. 10, p. 12 f.

Markl, Franz: Der Radierer Ernst Zipperer. In: Steglitzer Anzeiger. Heimatzeitung für den Südwesten Groß-Berlins. Berlin: Fischer. Vol 56 (1929), No. 101, May 1, 1929.

Massenberg, Norbert: Die Friedenauer Bajuwaren erstürmten die Tannenburg, den Herrschaftssitz von Herrn Zipperer. In: Mitteilungen. Vereinigung ehemaliger Schüler des Friedenauer Gymnasiums. Berlin: Westkreuz-Druckerei. No. 10, November 1959.

Kalinke, Dieter: Ein Stiller im Lande. In: Haller Tagblatt. Schwäbisch Hall. April 22, 1972, p. 20.

Rieber, Albrecht: Heute führen die Wege ins Unendliche. In: Heilbronner Stimme. Heilbronn. March 3, 1973, p. 21.

Resch, Simon: Liebenswürdiges altes Ulm. Radierungen von Ernst Zipperer im Kunsthaus Frey. In: Südwestpresse Ulm. Schwäbische Donauzeitung. Ulm. Vol. 34 (1978), No. 43, February 21, 1978, p. 14.

Martens, Jürgen: Erinnerungen an Ernst Zipperer. In: Mitteilungen. Vereinigung ehemaliger Schüler des Friedenauer Gymnasiums. Berlin: Westkreuz-Druckerei Berlin. Vol. 58, December 1982.

Zetzmann, Hans-Joachim: Ernst Zipperer – aus seinem Leben. In: Mitteilungen, Vereinigung ehemaliger Schüler des Friedenauer Gymnasiums. Berlin: Westkreuz-Druckerei Berlin. Vol 58, December 1982.

Pagel, Jutta: Haben Sie auch einen Zipperer? In: Haller Tagblatt. Schwäbisch Hall. June 28, 2002, p. 26.

Klaus, Torsten. In: Leipziger Volkszeitung. Ausgabe: Dresdner Neueste Nachrichten. Dresden. April 24, 2006, p. 13.

Grupp, Anselm: Schloss Tannenburg. In: Ellwanger Jahrbuch. Band 41, 2006 - 2007. Edited by Geschichts- und Altertumsverein Ellwangen, 2008, p. 336–345.

Staudacher, Bernhard: Die Tannenburg. In: Ellwanger Jahrbuch. Band 42, 2008 - 2009. Edited by Geschichts- und Altertumsverein Ellwangen, 2010, p. 493–523.

Christ, Michaela: Einäugiger Blick auf die Heimat. In: Hohenloher Tagblatt. Crailsheim. June 28, 2013.

Schweikert, Elisabeth: Zipperer-Werke im Rathaus. In: Haller Tagblatt. Schwäbisch Hall. Vol. 143, June 23, 2016, p. 22.

Richter, Rainer: Heimatverein Bühlertann zeigt Bilder von Ernst Zipperer. In: Haller Tagblatt. Schwäbisch Hall. June 29, 2016, p. 29.

Christ, Michaela: Auf Spurensuche. In: Haller Tagblatt. Schwäbisch Hall. February 9, 2017, p. 21.

Oklmann, Verena: Künstlerenkel sucht nach Bildern. In: Schwäbische Zeitung. Ravensburg. June 27, 2018, p. 18.

Snurawa, Ralf: Von der Natur zur Reduktion. In: Haller Tagblatt. Schwäbisch Hall. July 17, 2018, p. 13.

Weber, Werner: Meisterliches altes Rothenburg. Sonderausstellung im Hällisch-Fränkischen Museum mit Zipperer-Kaltnadelradierungen. In: Fränkischer Anzeiger. Rothenburg o. d. Tauber. Vol. 204, September 4, 2018.

Lober, Bettina: Andenken an den Malersopa. In: Haller Tagblatt: Schwäbisch Hall. September 13, 2018, p. 11.

==== Unauthorized, non-autographed writings - chronological ====
Bilder aus Heimat und Welt. In: Sonntagsbeiträge der Weser-Zeitung. Bremen. November 27, 1927.

Untitled. In: Braunschweigische Landeszeitung. Braunschweig. December 21, 1927.

Zur Ausstellung von Radierungen Ernst Zipperers. In: Ipf- und Jagst-zeitung / Ellwanger Tagblatt. Ellwangen. Vol 115 115 (1933), No. 237, October 28, 1933, p. 5.

Die Kunstausstellung im Bürgersaal. In: Offenburger Zeitung. Offenburg. No. 237, October 15, 1927, p. 4.

Untitled. In: Vaterstädtische Blätter. Lübeck. (1927/28) No. 3, October 30, 1927, p. 3f.

Untitled. In: Hamburger Illustrierte. Hamburg: Verlag Biroschek (1928), No. 31.

Der Radierer Ernst Zipperer. In: Soldiner Zeitung. Soldin. Vol. 83 (1929) No. 232, October 3, 1929, p. 2.

Kunstausstellung im Kunsthaus Göbel. In: Ulmer Tagblatt. Ulm. No. 87, April 16, 1931.

Der Maler auf der Tannenburg. In: Haller Tagblatt. Schwäbisch Hall. No. 226, September 30, 1961.

Ernst Zipperer von der Tannenburg stellt aus. In: Aalener Volkszeitung / Ipf- und Jagstzeitung. Aalen. No. 153, July 6, 1963, p. 11.

Die Tannenburg – eine Trutzveste aus der Stauferzeit. In: Haller Tagblatt. Schwäbisch Hall. May 14, 1966, p. 8f.

Jedes Bild ist ein Wettlauf mit der Sonne. In: Haller Tagblatt. Schwäbisch Hall. October 29, 1966, p. 8f.

‚Der Weg‘ - Vision und Auftrag, Ernst Zipperer zum 80. Geburtstag. In: Haller Tagblatt. Schwäbisch Hall. February 23, 1968, p. 9.

Sparkasse wird zur Gemäldegalerie. In: Aalener Volkszeitung / Ipf- und Jagstzeitung. Aalen. No. 92, April 21, 1972, p. 21.

Der Maler und Kunsterzieher Ernst Zipperer wird 85. In: Haller Tagblatt. Schwäbisch Hall. February 23, 1973, p. 26.

Das Schloß zeichnerisch verewigt. In: Heilbronner Stimme. Heilbronn. March 3, 1973.

Ulmer Motive – ins Künstlerische übersetzt. In: Südwestpresse Ulm. Schwäbische Donauzeitung. Ulm. Vol. 34 (1978) No. 35, February 11, 1978, p. 15.

Ausstellung im Kunsthaus Frey in Ulm zum 90. Geburtstag. In: Ulmer Zeitung. Ulm. February 11, 1978.

Ernst Zipperer zum 90. Geburtstag. In: Haller Tagblatt. Schwäbisch Hall. No. 45, February 23, 1978.

Ernst Zipperer in Flein gestorben. In: Haller Tagblatt. Schwäbisch Hall. No. 121, May 28, 1982, p. 24.

Blick über die Dächer. In: Südwestpresse Ulm. Schwäbische Donauzeitung. Vol. 38 (1982) No. 124, June 2, 1982, p. 20.

Ernst Zipperer in Schwäbisch Hall. In: Südwestpresse Ulm, Ulm, August 7, 2018, p. 21.
