= Ed Zipperer =

American politician (1931–2024)

Member of the Georgia State Senate from the 3rd district
- In office 1967–1975
- Succeeded by: Mell Traylor

Personal details
- Born: August 8, 1931 Savannah, Georgia, U.S.
- Died: October 24, 2024 (aged 93)
- Party: Democratic

Edward Helmey Zipperer (August 8, 1931 – October 24, 2024) was an American politician and farmer from the state of Georgia. He served as a Democratic member of the Georgia State Senate from 1967 to 1975.

Zipperer was born in Savannah, Georgia, the son of vegetable farmers. He attended and played football at Clemson University and the University of Georgia, earning a degree in agricultural engineering from the latter in 1954. He represented the Savannah-based 3rd senate district from 1967 to 1975, losing the 1974 Democratic primary to Mell Traylor, an aide to U.S. senator Herman Talmadge.

In 1996, Zipperer donated the land that now houses the Southwest elementary and middle schools for the Savannah-Chatham County Public Schools. He served on the councils of the Coastal Georgia RC&D (Resource, Conservation & Development) and Conservation District and for over forty years. He also served as president of the Chatham County chapter of the Georgia Farm Bureau Federation intermittently from the 1970s until his death. He died at the age of 93 on October 24, 2024.
